This is a list of 2180 species in the genus Onthophagus.

Onthophagus species

A

 Onthophagus abacus Boucomont, 1921
 Onthophagus abas Balthasar, 1946
 Onthophagus abei Ochi & Kon, 2015
 Onthophagus abeillei D'Orbigny, 1897
 Onthophagus abmisibilus Krikken & Huijbregts, 2012
 Onthophagus abreui Arrow, 1931
 Onthophagus abruptus D'Orbigny, 1913
 Onthophagus absyrtus Balthasar, 1946
 Onthophagus abyssinicus Gillet, 1925
 Onthophagus academus Balthasar, 1946
 Onthophagus aceroides Krikken & Huijbregts, 2013
 Onthophagus acerus Gillet, 1930
 Onthophagus aciculatulus Blatchley, 1928
 Onthophagus acrisius Balthasar, 1946
 Onthophagus acuminatus Harold, 1880
 Onthophagus acuticornis Endrödi, 1973
 Onthophagus adelaidae Hope, 1846
 Onthophagus adelphus Gillet, 1930
 Onthophagus admetus Balthasar, 1946
 Onthophagus adornatus D'Orbigny, 1904
 Onthophagus adspersus D'Orbigny, 1908
 Onthophagus aegrotus Balthasar, 1967
 Onthophagus aemulus Gillet, 1930
 Onthophagus aeneoniger D'Orbigny, 1913
 Onthophagus aeneopiceus D'Orbigny, 1902
 Onthophagus aenescens (Wiedemann, 1823)
 Onthophagus aequatus Péringuey, 1901
 Onthophagus aequepubens D'Orbigny, 1905
 Onthophagus aerarius Reitter, 1892
 Onthophagus aereidorsis D'Orbigny, 1902
 Onthophagus aeremicans D'Orbigny, 1904
 Onthophagus aereomaculatus Boucomont, 1914
 Onthophagus aereopictus Boucomont, 1914
 Onthophagus aerestriatus D'Orbigny, 1913
 Onthophagus aeruginosus Roth, 1851
 Onthophagus aesopus Lansberge, 1882
 Onthophagus aethiopicus D'Orbigny, 1902
 Onthophagus affinis Gillet, 1930
 Onthophagus afghanus Petrovitz, 1961
 Onthophagus africanus Lansberge, 1886
 Onthophagus agaricophilus Arrow, 1931
 Onthophagus agnus Gillet, 1925
 Onthophagus ahenicollis D'Orbigny, 1902
 Onthophagus ahenomicans D'Orbigny, 1902
 Onthophagus akhaus Masumoto, Ochi & Hanboonsong, 2007
 Onthophagus akinini Koenig, 1889
 Onthophagus alaindrumonti Krikken & Huijbregts, 2012
 Onthophagus albarracinus Baraud, 1979
 Onthophagus albicomus D'Orbigny, 1908
 Onthophagus albicornis (Palisot De Beauvois, 1805)
 Onthophagus albipennis Péringuey, 1908
 Onthophagus albipodex D'Orbigny, 1902
 Onthophagus aleppensis Redtenbacher, 1843
 Onthophagus alfuricus Huijbregts & Krikken, 2012
 Onthophagus alienus Frey, 1958
 Onthophagus allojavanus Huijbregts & Krikken, 2011
 Onthophagus alluaudi D'Orbigny, 1902
 Onthophagus alluvius Howden & Cartwright, 1963
 Onthophagus aloysiellus Zunino, 1977
 Onthophagus alquirta Matthews, 1972
 Onthophagus alternans Raffray, 1877
 Onthophagus altidorsis D'Orbigny, 1905
 Onthophagus altilamina D'Orbigny, 1905
 Onthophagus altivagans Howden & Génier, 2004
 Onthophagus amamiensis Nomura, 1965
 Onthophagus ambang Krikken & Huijbregts, 2011
 Onthophagus amicus (Gillet, 1925)
 Onthophagus amirus Kabakov, 1982
 Onthophagus amoenus D'Orbigny, 1908
 Onthophagus amphicoma Boucomont, 1914
 Onthophagus amphinasus Arrow, 1931
 Onthophagus amphioxus Arrow, 1933
 Onthophagus amplipennis D'Orbigny, 1905
 Onthophagus amycoides Kabakov, 2014
 Onthophagus anatolicus Petrovitz, 1962
 Onthophagus anchommatus Lea, 1923
 Onthophagus andalusicus Waltl, 1835
 Onthophagus andersoni Howden & Gill, 1987
 Onthophagus andonarensis Boucomont, 1914
 Onthophagus andreji Prokofiev, 2014
 Onthophagus andrewesi Arrow, 1931
 Onthophagus andrewsmithi Krikken & Huijbregts, 2012
 Onthophagus androgynus D'Orbigny, 1905
 Onthophagus anewtoni Howden & Génier, 2004
 Onthophagus angkhanensis Masumoto, Ochi & Hanboonsong, 2013
 Onthophagus angolensis Paulian, 1937
 Onthophagus angorensis Petrovitz, 1963
 Onthophagus angularis D'Orbigny, 1908
 Onthophagus anguliceps Boucomont, 1914
 Onthophagus angulicornis D'Orbigny, 1908
 Onthophagus angustatus Boucomont, 1914
 Onthophagus anisocerus Erichson, 1842
 Onthophagus annoyeri Moretto, 2010
 Onthophagus annulopunctatus Krikken & Huijbregts, 2017
 Onthophagus anogeissii Cambefort, 1984
 Onthophagus anomalicollis Frey, 1973
 Onthophagus anomalipes D'Orbigny, 1902
 Onthophagus antennalis Frey, 1961
 Onthophagus anthracinus Harold, 1873
 Onthophagus antillarum Arrow, 1903
 Onthophagus antilocapra Balthasar, 1937
 Onthophagus antivagans Howden and Génier, 2004
 Onthophagus antoinei Walter, 1990
 Onthophagus aphodioides Lansberge, 1883
 Onthophagus apicetinctus D'Orbigny, 1898
 Onthophagus apiciosus D'Orbigny, 1902
 Onthophagus apterus Matthews, 1972
 Onthophagus apunneea Masumoto, Ochi & Hanboonsong, 2007
 Onthophagus arai Masumoto, 1989
 Onthophagus arayai Ochi & Kon, 2007
 Onthophagus arboreus Arrow, 1931
 Onthophagus arcifer D'Orbigny, 1904
 Onthophagus ardoini Frey, 1971
 Onthophagus areolatus D'Orbigny, 1905
 Onthophagus argyropygus Gillet, 1927
 Onthophagus aries Kirby, 1825
 Onthophagus arkoola Storey & Weir, 1990
 Onthophagus armatus Blanchard, 1853
 Onthophagus arnetti Howden and Cartwright, 1963
 Onthophagus arnoldii Kabakov, 1982
 Onthophagus arrilla Matthews, 1972
 Onthophagus arunachalensis Biswas & Chatterjee, 1985
 Onthophagus arunensis Scheuern, 1995
 Onthophagus aschenborni Frey, 1975
 Onthophagus ashanticola Frey, 1973
 Onthophagus asiaticus Endrödi, 1973
 Onthophagus asimilis Péringuey, 1901
 Onthophagus asper MacLeay, 1864
 Onthophagus asperatus D'Orbigny, 1905
 Onthophagus aspericeps D'Orbigny, 1908
 Onthophagus aspericollis Lansberge, 1885
 Onthophagus asperipennis D'Orbigny, 1902
 Onthophagus aspernatus D'Orbigny, 1907
 Onthophagus asperodorsatus Howden & Gill, 1993
 Onthophagus asperrimus D'Orbigny, 1902
 Onthophagus asperulus D'Orbigny, 1905
 Onthophagus astigma D'Orbigny, 1904
 Onthophagus ater Waterhouse, 1875
 Onthophagus athiensis D'Orbigny, 1913
 Onthophagus atricapillus D'Orbigny, 1908
 Onthophagus atricolor D'Orbigny, 1907
 Onthophagus atridorsis D'Orbigny, 1902
 Onthophagus atriglabrus Howden & Gill, 1987
 Onthophagus atripennis Waterhouse, 1875
 Onthophagus atroaereus D'Orbigny, 1908
 Onthophagus atrofasciatus D'Orbigny, 1905
 Onthophagus atronitidus D'Orbigny, 1902
 Onthophagus atropolitus D'Orbigny, 1902
 Onthophagus atrosericeus Boucomont, 1932
 Onthophagus atrostriatus D'Orbigny, 1913
 Onthophagus atrovirens D'Orbigny, 1905
 Onthophagus atrovittatus D'Orbigny, 1908
 Onthophagus atrox Harold, 1867
 Onthophagus aureofuscus Bates, 1887
 Onthophagus aureopilosus Boucomont, 1914
 Onthophagus auriculatus Klug, 1855
 Onthophagus auritus Erichson, 1842
 Onthophagus australis Guérin-Méneville, 1830
 Onthophagus avocetta Arrow, 1933
 Onthophagus avocettoides (Kabakov, 1983)
 Onthophagus axillaris Boheman, 1860
 Onthophagus aztecus Zunino & Halffter, 1988
 Onthophagus azusae Ochi & Kon, 2006

B

 Onthophagus babaulti D'Orbigny, 1915
 Onthophagus babirussa Eschscholtz, 1822
 Onthophagus baenzigeri Masumoto, Ochi & Hanboonsong, 2007
 Onthophagus baeri Boucomont, 1914
 Onthophagus baiyericus Krikken & Huijbregts, 2013
 Onthophagus bakeri Boucomont, 1919
 Onthophagus bakweri Moretto, 2014
 Onthophagus balawaicus Scheuern, 1995
 Onthophagus baloghi Balthasar, 1967
 Onthophagus balthasari Vsetecka, 1939
 Onthophagus bambra Matthews, 1972
 Onthophagus bandamai Cambefort, 1984
 Onthophagus bangueyensis Boucomont, 1914
 Onthophagus baolocensis Ochi & Kon, 2015
 Onthophagus baoule Cambefort, 1984
 Onthophagus baramtagal Ochi, Kon & Barclay, 2016
 Onthophagus baraudi Nicolas, 1964
 Onthophagus barbieri Paulian, 1978
 Onthophagus barretti Génier & Howden, 1999
 Onthophagus barriorum Walter, 1990
 Onthophagus bartosi Balthasar, 1966
 Onthophagus basakata Walter & Cambefort, 1977
 Onthophagus basilewskyi Frey, 1961
 Onthophagus basipustulatus Heyden, 1889
 Onthophagus bassariscus Zunino & Halffter, 1988
 Onthophagus bateke Walter & Cambefort, 1977
 Onthophagus batesi Howden & Cartwright, 1963
 Onthophagus batillifer Harold, 1875
 Onthophagus batui Huijbregts & Krikken, 2009
 Onthophagus bayeri Balthasar, 1942
 Onthophagus baykanus Kabakov, 1994
 Onthophagus bechynei Frey, 1953
 Onthophagus beelarong Storey & Weir, 1990
 Onthophagus beesoni Arrow, 1931
 Onthophagus begoniophilus Krikken & Huijbregts, 2017
 Onthophagus beiranus Péringuey, 1908
 Onthophagus belinga Walter, 1989
 Onthophagus bellus D'Orbigny, 1905
 Onthophagus belorhinus Bates, 1887
 Onthophagus benedictorum Walter & Cambefort, 1977
 Onthophagus bengalensis Harold, 1886
 Onthophagus bengali Gordon & Oppenheimer, 1977
 Onthophagus benguellianus Paulian, 1937
 Onthophagus bennigseni Paulian, 1937
 Onthophagus bequaerti D'Orbigny, 1915
 Onthophagus bergeri Frey, 1975
 Onthophagus bernaudi Cambefort & Nicolas, 1991
 Onthophagus betschuanus Frey, 1975
 Onthophagus bicallifrons D'Orbigny, 1902
 Onthophagus bicarinaticeps Lea, 1923
 Onthophagus bicarinatus Gomes Alves, 1944
 Onthophagus bicavicollis Lea, 1923
 Onthophagus bicavifrons D'Orbigny, 1902
 Onthophagus bicolensis Ochi & Kon, 2006
 Onthophagus bicolor Raffray, 1877
 Onthophagus biconifer D'Orbigny, 1905
 Onthophagus bicornis Macleay, 1888
 Onthophagus bicristatus D'Orbigny, 1905
 Onthophagus bicristiger D'Orbigny, 1913
 Onthophagus bicuneus Kabakov, 2008
 Onthophagus bidens (Olivier, 1789)
 Onthophagus bidentatus Drapiez, 1819
 Onthophagus bidentifrons D'Orbigny, 1902
 Onthophagus biexcavatus D'Orbigny, 1898
 Onthophagus bifasciatus (Fabricius, 1781)
 Onthophagus bifidicornis D'Orbigny, 1902
 Onthophagus bifidus Reiche, 1847
 Onthophagus bifrons D'Orbigny, 1905
 Onthophagus bilingula Balthasar, 1965
 Onthophagus bimarginatus D'Orbigny, 1902
 Onthophagus bimetallicus D'Orbigny, 1907
 Onthophagus bindaree Storey & Weir, 1990
 Onthophagus binodis (Thunberg, 1818)
 Onthophagus binodosus D'Orbigny, 1908
 Onthophagus binodulus D'Orbigny, 1913
 Onthophagus binyana Storey & Weir, 1990
 Onthophagus biplagiatus Thomson, 1858
 Onthophagus birugatus D'Orbigny, 1902
 Onthophagus birugifer D'Orbigny, 1908
 Onthophagus bisbicornis D'Orbigny, 1909
 Onthophagus biscarinulatus Huijbregts & Krikken, 2012
 Onthophagus bisectus Arrow, 1931
 Onthophagus bisignatus D'Orbigny, 1913
 Onthophagus bison Boucomont, 1919
 Onthophagus bisontinus Heer, 1862
 Onthophagus bisscrutator Krikken & Huijbregts, 2017
 Onthophagus bistiniocelloides Krikken, 1986
 Onthophagus bituber D'Orbigny, 1904
 Onthophagus bituberans D'Orbigny, 1905
 Onthophagus bituberoculus Krikken & Huijbregts, 2013
 Onthophagus bivertex Heyden, 1887
 Onthophagus blackburni Shipp, 1895
 Onthophagus blackwoodensis Blackburn, 1891
 Onthophagus blanchardi Harold, 1869
 Onthophagus blumei Lansberge, 1883
 Onthophagus bocandei D'Orbigny, 1904
 Onthophagus bokiaunus Masumoto, 1995
 Onthophagus bomberaianus Balthasar, 1969
 Onthophagus bonengus Kabakov, 1994
 Onthophagus bongkudai Krikken & Huijbregts, 2017
 Onthophagus bonorae Zunino, 1976
 Onthophagus bonsae Zunino, 1976
 Onthophagus boops D'Orbigny, 1905
 Onthophagus borassi Cambefort, 1984
 Onthophagus bordati Moretto, 2014
 Onthophagus borneensis Harold, 1877
 Onthophagus bornemisszai Matthews, 1972
 Onthophagus bornemisszanus Matthews, 1972
 Onthophagus borneotagal Ochi, Kon & Barclay, 2016
 Onthophagus boucomonti Paulian, 1931
 Onthophagus boucomontianus Balthasar, 1935
 Onthophagus bourgognei Paulian, 1945
 Onthophagus bovinus Péringuey, 1892
 Onthophagus brachypterus Zunino & Halffter, 1997
 Onthophagus brazzavillianus Balthasar, 1974
 Onthophagus breviceps D'Orbigny, 1902
 Onthophagus brevicollis Arrow, 1907
 Onthophagus breviconus Génier & Howden, 1999
 Onthophagus brevifrons Horn, 1881
 Onthophagus brevigena D'Orbigny, 1902
 Onthophagus brevipennis D'Orbigny, 1902
 Onthophagus brevisetis D'Orbigny, 1915
 Onthophagus brittoni Paulian, 1948
 Onthophagus brivioi Frey, 1973
 Onthophagus bronzeus Arrow, 1907
 Onthophagus brooksi Matthews, 1972
 Onthophagus browni Howden & Cartwright, 1963
 Onthophagus brunellii Muller, 1942
 Onthophagus brutus Arrow, 1931
 Onthophagus buculus Mannerheim, 1829
 Onthophagus bufulus Arrow, 1941
 Onthophagus bunamin Matthews, 1972
 Onthophagus bundara Storey & Weir, 1990
 Onthophagus burchelli D'Orbigny, 1908
 Onthophagus busiris Balthasar, 1969
 Onthophagus bytinskii Balthasar, 1960

C

 Onthophagus caelator Balthasar, 1967
 Onthophagus caesariatus Boucomont, 1921
 Onthophagus calamophilus Krikken, 1977
 Onthophagus calcaratus Boucomont, 1919
 Onthophagus calchas Balthasar, 1967
 Onthophagus calliger D'Orbigny, 1913
 Onthophagus callosipennis Boucomont, 1930
 Onthophagus cambrai Delgado & Curoe, 2014
 Onthophagus cameloides D'Orbigny, 1900
 Onthophagus camerunicus D'Orbigny, 1905
 Onthophagus cancer Lansberge, 1886
 Onthophagus canelasensis Howden and Génier, 2004
 Onthophagus capella Kirby, 1818
 Onthophagus capelliformis Gillet, 1925
 Onthophagus capellinus Frey, 1963
 Onthophagus capitatus Castelnau, 1840
 Onthophagus capitosus Harold, 1867
 Onthophagus caprai Frey, 1956
 Onthophagus carayoni Cambefort, 1986
 Onthophagus carcharias Harold, 1875
 Onthophagus carinensis Boucomont, 1914
 Onthophagus carinicollis Raffray, 1877
 Onthophagus carinidorsis D'Orbigny, 1908
 Onthophagus carinifer D'Orbigny, 1904
 Onthophagus carinulatus Harold, 1877
 Onthophagus carmodensis Blackburn, 1907
 Onthophagus carpanetoi Pittino, 1982
 Onthophagus carpophilus Pereira & Halffter, 1961
 Onthophagus cartwrighti Howden, 1973
 Onthophagus castetsi Lansberge, 1887
 Onthophagus catenatus Lansberge, 1883
 Onthophagus catharinensis Paulian, 1936
 Onthophagus catta (Fabricius, 1787)
 Onthophagus cavernicollis Howden & Cartwright, 1963
 Onthophagus cavia Boucomont, 1914
 Onthophagus caviceps Frey, 1962
 Onthophagus cavifrons Harold, 1886
 Onthophagus cavivertex D'Orbigny, 1913
 Onthophagus centricornis (Fabricius, 1798)
 Onthophagus centurio Lansberge, 1885
 Onthophagus cephalophi Cambefort, 1984
 Onthophagus cernyi Balthasar, 1935
 Onthophagus cervenkai Kabakov, 2008
 Onthophagus cervicapra Boucomont, 1914
 Onthophagus cervus (Fabricius, 1798)
 Onthophagus ceylonicus Harold, 1859
 Onthophagus chaiyaphumensis Masumoto, Ochi & Hanboonsong, 2002
 Onthophagus championi Bates, 1887
 Onthophagus chandrai Ochi, 2007
 Onthophagus changshouensis Zhang, 1997
 Onthophagus chebaicus Boucomont, 1919
 Onthophagus cheesmanae Arrow, 1941
 Onthophagus chepara Matthews, 1972
 Onthophagus chetroiensis Masumoto, Ochi & Sakchoowong, 2012
 Onthophagus chevrolati Harold, 1869
 Onthophagus cheyi Ochi & Kon, 2006
 Onthophagus chiapanecus Zunino & Halffter, 1988
 Onthophagus chineicus Kabakov, 1998
 Onthophagus chinensis (Balthasar, 1952)
 Onthophagus chirindanus D'Orbigny, 1913
 Onthophagus chloroderus D'Orbigny, 1905
 Onthophagus chlorophanus D'Orbigny, 1902
 Onthophagus choanicus D'Orbigny, 1904
 Onthophagus chremes Balthasar, 1969
 Onthophagus chryses Bates, 1887
 Onthophagus chrysoderus D'Orbigny, 1905
 Onthophagus chrysurus Arrow, 1931
 Onthophagus chumphonensis Masumoto, Ochi & Hanboonsong, 2008
 Onthophagus cicer Balthasar, 1964
 Onthophagus cincticollis D'Orbigny, 1902
 Onthophagus cinctifrons D'Orbigny, 1902
 Onthophagus cinctipennis Quedenfeldt, 1884
 Onthophagus cineraceus D'Orbigny, 1902
 Onthophagus circulator Reitter, 1891
 Onthophagus circulifer Arrow, 1931
 Onthophagus circumdatus D'Orbigny, 1913
 Onthophagus citreum Boucomont, 1919
 Onthophagus civettae Cambefort, 1984
 Onthophagus clavijeroi Moctezuma, Rossini & Zunino, 2016
 Onthophagus clavisetis D'Orbigny, 1905
 Onthophagus clermonti Paulian, 1931
 Onthophagus clitellarius D'Orbigny, 1908
 Onthophagus clitellifer Reitter, 1894
 Onthophagus clivimerus Huijbregts & Krikken, 2011
 Onthophagus cludtsi Ochi, 2003
 Onthophagus clusifrons D'Orbigny, 1905
 Onthophagus clypealis Lea, 1923
 Onthophagus clypeatus Blanchard, 1846
 Onthophagus coahuilae Zunino and Halffter, 1988
 Onthophagus cochisus Brown, 1927
 Onthophagus coenobita (Herbst, 1783)
 Onthophagus coeruleicollis Arrow, 1907
 Onthophagus cognatus Boucomont, 1921
 Onthophagus coiffaiti Frey, 1970
 Onthophagus colasi Paulian, 1937
 Onthophagus colffsi Lansberge, 1883
 Onthophagus collaris Kabakov, 1983
 Onthophagus collinsi Krikken & Huijbregts, 1987
 Onthophagus comatulus D'Orbigny, 1905
 Onthophagus commottoides Kabakov, 1998
 Onthophagus comottoi Lansberge, 1885
 Onthophagus compactus Arrow, 1933
 Onthophagus comperei Blackburn, 1903
 Onthophagus compositus Lea, 1923
 Onthophagus compressus Guérin-Méneville, 1855
 Onthophagus concavifrons D'Orbigny, 1904
 Onthophagus concinnus Laporte, 1840
 Onthophagus concolor Sharp, 1878
 Onthophagus confertus Péringuey, 1908
 Onthophagus confluens D'Orbigny, 1902
 Onthophagus conradsi Balthasar, 1937
 Onthophagus consentaneus Harold, 1867
 Onthophagus conspersus Reitter, 1892
 Onthophagus conspicuus MacLeay, 1864
 Onthophagus contiguicornis D'Orbigny, 1913
 Onthophagus convexicollis Boheman, 1858
 Onthophagus convexus D'Orbigny, 1908
 Onthophagus cooloola Storey & Weir, 1990
 Onthophagus coomani Paulian, 1931
 Onthophagus coorgensis Arrow, 1931
 Onthophagus coprimorphoides Huijbregts & Krikken, 2012
 Onthophagus coprimorphus Gillet, 1930
 Onthophagus coproides Horn, 1881
 Onthophagus coptorhinodes Péringuey, 1901
 Onthophagus coracinoides Kabakov, 1983
 Onthophagus coracinus Boucomont, 1914
 Onthophagus coriaceoumbrosus Kohlmann & Solis, 2001
 Onthophagus corniculatus Reiche, 1847
 Onthophagus corniculiger D'Orbigny, 1913
 Onthophagus cornifrons Thomson, 1858
 Onthophagus cornutus Ferreira, 1971
 Onthophagus coronatus D'Orbigny, 1902
 Onthophagus corrosus Bates, 1887
 Onthophagus coscineus Bates, 1887
 Onthophagus costatus D'Orbigny, 1913
 Onthophagus costifer Gillet, 1930
 Onthophagus costiger D'Orbigny, 1915
 Onthophagus costilatus D'Orbigny, 1908
 Onthophagus costulicollis Frey, 1975
 Onthophagus crantor Balthasar, 1967
 Onthophagus crassicollis Boucomont, 1913
 Onthophagus crassus Heer, 1862
 Onthophagus cratippus Balthasar, 1969
 Onthophagus creber D'Orbigny, 1905
 Onthophagus cribellum D'Orbigny, 1902
 Onthophagus cribratus Lansberge, 1883
 Onthophagus cribricollis Horn, 1881
 Onthophagus cribripennis D'Orbigny, 1902
 Onthophagus criniger D'Orbigny, 1904
 Onthophagus crinitus Harold, 1869
 Onthophagus cristatus D'Orbigny, 1905
 Onthophagus croesulus Bates, 1888
 Onthophagus crotchi Harold, 1871
 Onthophagus crucenotatus D'Orbigny, 1905
 Onthophagus cruciatus Ménétriès, 1832
 Onthophagus cruciger Macleay, 1888
 Onthophagus cruentatus Klug, 1855
 Onthophagus cryptodicranius Kohlmann & Solis, 2001
 Onthophagus cryptogenus Boucomont, 1914
 Onthophagus cuevensis Howden, 1973
 Onthophagus cuneus Boucomont, 1924
 Onthophagus cuniculus MacLeay, 1864
 Onthophagus cupreiceps Arrow, 1907
 Onthophagus cupreopastillatus Ochi & Kon, 2006
 Onthophagus cupreotagal Ochi, Kon & Barclay, 2016
 Onthophagus cupreovirens D'Orbigny, 1904
 Onthophagus cupreus Harold, 1880
 Onthophagus cupricollis Péringuey, 1888
 Onthophagus curtipilis D'Orbigny, 1905
 Onthophagus curtulus Frey, 1961
 Onthophagus curvicarinatus Boucomont, 1914
 Onthophagus curvicornis Latreille, 1812
 Onthophagus curvifrons D'Orbigny, 1906
 Onthophagus curvilamina Muller, 1942
 Onthophagus curvispina Reitter, 1892
 Onthophagus cyaneiceps D'Orbigny, 1913
 Onthophagus cyanellus Bates, 1887
 Onthophagus cyaneoniger D'Orbigny, 1902
 Onthophagus cyaneus Kabakov, 2006
 Onthophagus cyanochlorus D'Orbigny, 1902
 Onthophagus cyclographus Bates, 1887
 Onthophagus cynomysi Brown, 1927
 Onthophagus cyobioides Boucomont, 1921

D

 Onthophagus dacatrai Pittino, 2004
 Onthophagus dama (Fabricius, 1798)
 Onthophagus dandalu Matthews, 1972
 Onthophagus danumensis Ochi, Kon & Barclay, 2009
 Onthophagus danumicus Huijbregts & Krikken, 2012
 Onthophagus dapcauensis Boucomont, 1921
 Onthophagus dapitanensis Boucomont, 1919
 Onthophagus darlingtoni Matthews, 1972
 Onthophagus davisi Frey, 1975
 Onthophagus dayacus Boucomont, 1914
 Onthophagus daymanus Krikken & Huijbregts, 2013
 Onthophagus debilis D'Orbigny, 1905
 Onthophagus deccanensis Frey, 1962
 Onthophagus decedens Péringuey, 1904
 Onthophagus decens Balthasar, 1964
 Onthophagus declivicollis D'Orbigny, 1902
 Onthophagus declivis Harold, 1869
 Onthophagus decolor D'Orbigny, 1902
 Onthophagus decoratus D'Orbigny, 1905
 Onthophagus decorsei D'Orbigny, 1908
 Onthophagus dedecor Wallengren, 1881
 Onthophagus deflexicollis Lansberge, 1883
 Onthophagus deflexus D'Orbigny, 1908
 Onthophagus delahayei Josso, 2011
 Onthophagus delicatulus Raffray, 1877
 Onthophagus delicatus D'Orbigny, 1915
 Onthophagus deliensis Lansberge, 1885
 Onthophagus dellacasai Pittino & Mariani, 1981
 Onthophagus delphinensis D'Orbigny, 1913
 Onthophagus demarzi Frey, 1959
 Onthophagus demeyeri Moretto, 2009
 Onthophagus densatus Frey, 1963
 Onthophagus densepunctatus Frey, 1963
 Onthophagus densipilis D'Orbigny, 1902
 Onthophagus denticollis Lansberge, 1883
 Onthophagus denticornis Boucomont, 1914
 Onthophagus denticulatus D'Orbigny, 1902
 Onthophagus denudatus D'Orbigny, 1902
 Onthophagus depilatus D'Orbigny, 1913
 Onthophagus depilis D'Orbigny, 1902
 Onthophagus deplanatus Lansberge, 1883
 Onthophagus depressicollis Boucomont, 1914
 Onthophagus depressifrons D'Orbigny, 1915
 Onthophagus depressipennis Cambefort, 1975
 Onthophagus depressus Harold, 1871  (flat African dung beetle)
 Onthophagus derasus D'Orbigny, 1902
 Onthophagus desaegeri Frey, 1961
 Onthophagus desectus MacLeay, 1871
 Onthophagus deterrens Péringuey, 1901
 Onthophagus devagiriensis Schoolmeesters & Thomas, 2006
 Onthophagus devexicornis Gillet, 1930
 Onthophagus devexus Macleay, 1888
 Onthophagus dhanjuricus Frey, 1973
 Onthophagus diabolicus Harold, 1877
 Onthophagus diadematus D'Orbigny, 1902
 Onthophagus dicax Balthasar, 1966
 Onthophagus dicella Bates, 1888
 Onthophagus dicranius Bates, 1887
 Onthophagus dicranocerus Gillet, 1925
 Onthophagus dicranoides Balthasar, 1939
 Onthophagus difficilis Le Guillou, 1844
 Onthophagus digitatus Arrow, 1931
 Onthophagus dignus Gillet, 1930
 Onthophagus dilutus D'Orbigny, 1905
 Onthophagus dinjeera Storey & Weir, 1990
 Onthophagus dinoderus D'Orbigny, 1913
 Onthophagus discolor Hope, 1841
 Onthophagus discovirens D'Orbigny, 1902
 Onthophagus discretus Péringuey, 1901
 Onthophagus dispar Péringuey, 1901
 Onthophagus dissentaneus Balthasar, 1964
 Onthophagus dissidentatus Krikken & Huijbregts, 2013
 Onthophagus distichus Roth, 1851
 Onthophagus ditus Péringuey, 1901
 Onthophagus diversus Reiche, 1847
 Onthophagus dlabolai Balthasar, 1964
 Onthophagus dohertyi D'Orbigny, 1902
 Onthophagus doiinthanonensis Masumoto, 1989
 Onthophagus doipuiensis Masumoto, 1989
 Onthophagus doisuthepensis Masumoto, 1989
 Onthophagus doitungensis Masumoto, Ochi & Hanboonsong, 2002
 Onthophagus doriae Harold, 1877
 Onthophagus dorsipilulus Howden & Gill, 1987
 Onthophagus dorsofasciatus Fairmaire, 1893
 Onthophagus dorsosignatus D'Orbigny, 1898
 Onthophagus dorsuosus D'Orbigny, 1902
 Onthophagus drescheri Paulian, 1939
 Onthophagus dryander Monteith & Storey, 2013
 Onthophagus dubernardi Boucomont, 1914
 Onthophagus dubitabilis Howden & Génier, 2004
 Onthophagus duboulayi Waterhouse, 1894
 Onthophagus ducorpsi D'Orbigny, 1913
 Onthophagus dummal Matthews, 1972
 Onthophagus dunningi Harold, 1869
 Onthophagus duporti Boucomont, 1914
 Onthophagus durangoensis Balthasar, 1939
 Onthophagus duvivieri D'Orbigny, 1904
 Onthophagus dynastoides Arrow, 1931

E

 Onthophagus ebenicolor D'Orbigny, 1902
 Onthophagus ebenus Péringuey, 1888
 Onthophagus eburneus D'Orbigny, 1913
 Onthophagus echinus Boucomont, 1914
 Onthophagus ecopas Josso & Prévost, 2006
 Onthophagus egenus Harold, 1877
 Onthophagus elegans Klug, 1832
 Onthophagus eliptaminus Balthasar, 1969
 Onthophagus elongatus Frey, 1954
 Onthophagus emarginatus Mulsant, 1842
 Onthophagus embersoni Masumoto, Hanboonsong & Ochi, 2002
 Onthophagus embrikianus Paulian, 1936
 Onthophagus emeritus Péringuey, 1901
 Onthophagus endota Matthews, 1972
 Onthophagus endroedianus Walter & Cambefort, 1977
 Onthophagus ensifer Boucomont, 1914
 Onthophagus enuguensis Frey, 1975
 Onthophagus ephippioderus Arrow, 1907
 Onthophagus epilamprus Bates, 1888
 Onthophagus erectinasus D'Orbigny, 1902
 Onthophagus erichsoni Hope, 1841
 Onthophagus escalerai D'Orbigny, 1902
 Onthophagus eschscholtzi Boucomont, 1924
 Onthophagus eulaminicornis Pittino, 2006
 Onthophagus eulophus Bates, 1887
 Onthophagus euryceros Kabakov, 1998
 Onthophagus euzeti Walter & Cambefort, 1977
 Onthophagus evae Balthasar, 1944
 Onthophagus evanidus Harold, 1869
 Onthophagus everestae Pierce, 1946
 Onthophagus exasperatus Gerstaecker, 1871
 Onthophagus excisiceps D'Orbigny, 1902
 Onthophagus excisus Reiche & Saulcy, 1856
 Onthophagus excubitor Ziani & Gudenzi, 2006
 Onthophagus exiguus Raffray, 1877
 Onthophagus exilis D'Orbigny, 1913
 Onthophagus expansicornis Bates, 1891
 Onthophagus exquisitus Arrow, 1931
 Onthophagus extensicollis D'Orbigny, 1907

F

 Onthophagus fabricianus Goidanich, 1926
 Onthophagus fabricii Waterhouse, 1894
 Onthophagus falcarius Balthasar, 1966
 Onthophagus falcifer Harold, 1880
 Onthophagus falculatus Boucomont, 1914
 Onthophagus fallaciosus Raffray, 1877
 Onthophagus falsivigilans Masumoto, 1995
 Onthophagus falsus Gillet, 1925
 Onthophagus falzonii Goidanich, 1926
 Onthophagus fasciatus Boucomont, 1914
 Onthophagus fasciculiger D'Orbigny, 1902
 Onthophagus fasciolatus Boucomont, 1924
 Onthophagus favrei Boucomont, 1914
 Onthophagus feai D'Orbigny, 1905
 Onthophagus felix Arrow, 1931
 Onthophagus ferox Harold, 1867
 Onthophagus ferrari Matthews, 1972
 Onthophagus filicornis Harold, 1873
 Onthophagus fimetarius Roth, 1851
 Onthophagus finschi Harold, 1877
 Onthophagus fissiceps Macleay, 1888
 Onthophagus fissicornis (Steven, 1809)
 Onthophagus fissinasus Fairmaire, 1895
 Onthophagus fitiniensis Cambefort, 1984
 Onthophagus flagrans Reitter, 1892
 Onthophagus flavibasis D'Orbigny, 1904
 Onthophagus flaviclava D'Orbigny, 1902
 Onthophagus flavicornis Germar, 1824
 Onthophagus flavimargo D'Orbigny, 1902
 Onthophagus flavipennis D'Orbigny, 1905
 Onthophagus flavoapicalis Lea, 1923
 Onthophagus flavocinctus Frey, 1975
 Onthophagus flavolimbatus Klug, 1855
 Onthophagus flavomaculatus Gillet, 1930
 Onthophagus flavorufus D'Orbigny, 1904
 Onthophagus fletcheri Blackburn, 1903
 Onthophagus flexicornis D'Orbigny, 1902
 Onthophagus flexifrons D'Orbigny, 1908
 Onthophagus fodiens Waterhouse, 1875
 Onthophagus foedus Boucomont, 1914
 Onthophagus foliaceus Lansberge, 1886
 Onthophagus foliiceps Quedenfeldt, 1884
 Onthophagus foraminosus D'Orbigny, 1902
 Onthophagus formaneki Reitter, 1897
 Onthophagus fortigibber Reitter, 1909
 Onthophagus fossibasis D'Orbigny, 1908
 Onthophagus fossifrons D'Orbigny, 1902
 Onthophagus fossor Arrow, 1931
 Onthophagus fossulatus D'Orbigny, 1908
 Onthophagus foulliouxi Cambefort, 1971
 Onthophagus foveatus Frey, 1957
 Onthophagus foveicollis Boucomont, 1930
 Onthophagus fracticornis (Preyssler, 1790)
 Onthophagus fradei Gomes Alves, 1956
 Onthophagus fragosus Génier & Howden, 2014
 Onthophagus francoisgenieri Krikken & Huijbregts, 2012
 Onthophagus francoisi Josso, 2013
 Onthophagus frankenbergeri Balthasar, 1933
 Onthophagus frankrozendaali Huijbregts & Krikken, 2012
 Onthophagus frenchi Blackburn, 1903
 Onthophagus fritschi D'Orbigny, 1902
 Onthophagus frontalis Raffray, 1877
 Onthophagus frugivorus Arrow, 1931
 Onthophagus fugitivus Péringuey, 1901
 Onthophagus fujiii Ochi & Kon, 1995
 Onthophagus fuliginosus Erichson, 1842
 Onthophagus fulvocinctus D'Orbigny, 1902
 Onthophagus fulvus Sharp, 1875
 Onthophagus fumatus D'Orbigny, 1913
 Onthophagus funestus Moretto & Génier, 2010
 Onthophagus fungicola D'Orbigny, 1908
 Onthophagus furcaticeps Masters, 1886
 Onthophagus furcatoides Lansberge, 1886
 Onthophagus furcatus (Fabricius, 1781)
 Onthophagus furciceps Marseul, 1869
 Onthophagus furcicollis Arrow, 1931
 Onthophagus furcillifer Bates, 1891
 Onthophagus furculifer D'Orbigny, 1905
 Onthophagus furculus (Fabricius, 1798)
 Onthophagus fuscatus D'Orbigny, 1908
 Onthophagus fuscidorsis D Orbigny, 1902
 Onthophagus fuscivestis D'Orbigny, 1902
 Onthophagus fuscopunctatus (Fabricius, 1798)
 Onthophagus fuscostriatus Boucomont, 1914
 Onthophagus fuscus Boucomont, 1932

G

 Onthophagus gabonensis Walter, 1989
 Onthophagus gaesatus Boucomont, 1925
 Onthophagus gagates Hope, 1831
 Onthophagus gagatinus Gillet, 1930
 Onthophagus gagatoides Kabakov, 2006
 Onthophagus gaillardi D'Orbigny, 1911
 Onthophagus gajo Krikken, 1977
 Onthophagus galeatus Boucomont, 1919
 Onthophagus ganalensis Gestro, 1895
 Onthophagus gandju Matthews, 1972
 Onthophagus gangeticus Gillet, 1925
 Onthophagus gangulu Matthews, 1972
 Onthophagus garambae Frey, 1961
 Onthophagus gazella (Fabricius, 1787)
 Onthophagus gazellinus Bates, 1887
 Onthophagus geelongensis Blackburn, 1891
 Onthophagus gemellatus Raffray, 1877
 Onthophagus geminatus D'Orbigny, 1907
 Onthophagus geminifrons D'Orbigny, 1905
 Onthophagus gemma (Sharp, 1875)
 Onthophagus genuinus Kohlmann & Solis, 2001
 Onthophagus germanus Gillet, 1927
 Onthophagus geryon Balthasar, 1969
 Onthophagus gestroi Harold, 1877
 Onthophagus ghanensis Balthasar, 1966
 Onthophagus gibbicollis Lansberge, 1885
 Onthophagus gibbidorsis D'Orbigny, 1902
 Onthophagus gibbifrons D'Orbigny, 1902
 Onthophagus gibbulus (Pallas, 1781)
 Onthophagus gibbus D'Orbigny, 1913
 Onthophagus gibsoni Howden & Génier, 2004
 Onthophagus gidju Matthews, 1972
 Onthophagus gigantivigilans Masumoto, Hanboonsong & Ochi, 2002
 Onthophagus gilli Delgado & Howden, 2000
 Onthophagus ginyunensis Vsetecka, 1942
 Onthophagus giraffa (Hausmann, 1807)
 Onthophagus girardinae Walter, 1989
 Onthophagus giuseppecarpanetoi Tagliaferri & Moretto, 2012
 Onthophagus glabratus Hope, 1842
 Onthophagus glasunovi Koshantschikov, 1894
 Onthophagus glaucinus Gillet, 1930
 Onthophagus gnu Frey, 1955
 Onthophagus godarra Storey & Weir, 1990
 Onthophagus gonipa Krikken & Huijbregts, 2011
 Onthophagus gonopygus D'Orbigny, 1902
 Onthophagus gorochovi Kabakov, 1998
 Onthophagus gorodinskii Kabakov, 2008
 Onthophagus gorokae Paulian, 1972
 Onthophagus gothicus Gillet, 1930
 Onthophagus gracilipes Boucomont, 1914
 Onthophagus gradivus Balthasar, 1966
 Onthophagus grandidorsis D'Orbigny, 1913
 Onthophagus grandifrons D'Orbigny, 1907
 Onthophagus grandivigilans Masumoto, 1995
 Onthophagus graniceps D'Orbigny, 1908
 Onthophagus granosus D'Orbigny, 1913
 Onthophagus granulatus Boheman, 1858
 Onthophagus granulifer Harold, 1886
 Onthophagus granulifrons Frey, 1961
 Onthophagus granulipennis Lansberge, 1886
 Onthophagus granulum D'Orbigny, 1904
 Onthophagus granum Lansberge, 1885
 Onthophagus graphicus Wallengren, 1881
 Onthophagus grassei Walter, 1989
 Onthophagus grataehelenae Kohlmann & Solis, 2001
 Onthophagus gratus Arrow, 1931
 Onthophagus gravearmatus Balthasar, 1944
 Onthophagus gravis Walker, 1858
 Onthophagus gravoti D'Orbigny, 1908
 Onthophagus griseoaeneus Lansberge, 1885
 Onthophagus griseosetosus Arrow, 1931
 Onthophagus grossepunctatus Reitter, 1905
 Onthophagus guatemalensis Bates, 1887
 Onthophagus gulmarri Matthews, 1972
 Onthophagus gulo Arrow, 1931
 Onthophagus gurburra Storey & Weir, 1990
 Onthophagus guttatus Boheman, 1860
 Onthophagus guttiger D'Orbigny, 1905

H

 Onthophagus haafi Frey, 1963
 Onthophagus haagi Harold, 1867
 Onthophagus haematopus Harold, 1875
 Onthophagus hageni Lansberge, 1883
 Onthophagus hagenmontis Krikken & Huijbregts, 2012
 Onthophagus hajimei Masumoto, 1984
 Onthophagus halffteri Zunino, 1981
 Onthophagus hamaticeps Arrow, 1931
 Onthophagus hamaticornis Gillet, 1930
 Onthophagus haroldi Ballion, 1870
 Onthophagus hartiniae Ochi & Kon, 2009
 Onthophagus hastifer Lansberge, 1885
 Onthophagus hayashii Masumoto, 1991
 Onthophagus hecate (Panzer, 1794)  (scooped scarab)
 Onthophagus helciatus Harold, 1871
 Onthophagus hemichalceus D'Orbigny, 1915
 Onthophagus hemichlorus D'Orbigny, 1915
 Onthophagus hemipygus Frey, 1964
 Onthophagus hericiniformis Moretto, 2010
 Onthophagus hericius D'Orbigny, 1908
 Onthophagus hermonensis Baraud, 1982
 Onthophagus herus Péringuey, 1901
 Onthophagus heteroclitus D'Orbigny, 1911
 Onthophagus heterorrhinus Lansberge, 1885
 Onthophagus heurni Gillet, 1930
 Onthophagus heydeni Harold, 1875
 Onthophagus heyrovskyi Vsetecka, 1943
 Onthophagus hiabunicus Kabakov, 1998
 Onthophagus hidakai Ochi & Kon, 1995
 Onthophagus hidalgus Zunino and Halffter, 1988
 Onthophagus hielkemai Krikken & Huijbregts, 2011
 Onthophagus hikidai Ochi & Kon, 2006
 Onthophagus hilaridis Cambefort, 1984
 Onthophagus hilaris D'Orbigny, 1905
 Onthophagus hildebrandti Harold, 1878
 Onthophagus hindu Arrow, 1931
 Onthophagus hingstoni Arrow, 1931
 Onthophagus hippopotamus Harold, 1869
 Onthophagus hirculus Mannerheim, 1829
 Onthophagus hircus Billberg, 1815
 Onthophagus hiroyukii Ochi, 2007
 Onthophagus hirsutulus Lansberge, 1883
 Onthophagus hirsutus D'Orbigny, 1902
 Onthophagus hirtellus Frey, 1957
 Onthophagus hirticulus D'Orbigny, 1915
 Onthophagus hirtipodex D'Orbigny, 1904
 Onthophagus hirtuosus Gillet, 1930
 Onthophagus hirtus (Illiger, 1803)
 Onthophagus hispanicus Baraud, 1963
 Onthophagus hissariensis Kabakov, 2006
 Onthophagus histeriformis Boucomont, 1914
 Onthophagus histrio D'Orbigny, 1902
 Onthophagus hoberlandti Balthasar, 1966
 Onthophagus hoepfneri Harold, 1869
 Onthophagus hollowayi Krikken & Huijbregts, 2017
 Onthophagus holosericus Harold, 1877
 Onthophagus holzi Boucomont, 1914
 Onthophagus hoogstraali Saylor, 1943
 Onthophagus hoplocerus Lea, 1923
 Onthophagus hoplothorax Gillet, 1930
 Onthophagus horii Ochi, Kon & Tsubaki, 2009
 Onthophagus horrens D'Orbigny, 1908
 Onthophagus horribilis Balthasar, 1969
 Onthophagus horridus D'Orbigny, 1908
 Onthophagus hosomai Ochi & Kon, 2014
 Onthophagus howdenorum Zunino & Halffter, 1988
 Onthophagus hsui Masumoto, Chen & Ochi, 2004
 Onthophagus hulstaerti Boucomont, 1932
 Onthophagus humpatensis Lansberge, 1886
 Onthophagus hyaena (Fabricius, 1801)
 Onthophagus hystrix Boucomont, 1914

I

 Onthophagus ibex (Fabricius, 1792)
 Onthophagus ieti Cambefort, 1984
 Onthophagus ifugaoensis Ochi & Kon, 2006
 Onthophagus igualensis Bates, 1887
 Onthophagus illotus Péringuey, 1901
 Onthophagus illyricus (Scopoli, 1763)
 Onthophagus imbellis D'Orbigny, 1905
 Onthophagus imberbis D'Orbigny, 1902
 Onthophagus imbutus Sharp, 1875
 Onthophagus immundus Boheman, 1858
 Onthophagus importunus Péringuey, 1901
 Onthophagus impressicollis Boheman, 1860
 Onthophagus impunctatus D'Orbigny, 1904
 Onthophagus impurus Harold, 1868
 Onthophagus inaequalis D'Orbigny, 1902
 Onthophagus incantatus Balthasar, 1967
 Onthophagus incanus Macleay, 1888
 Onthophagus incensus Say, 1835
 Onthophagus incertus D'Orbigny, 1897
 Onthophagus incisus Harold, 1877
 Onthophagus includens D'Orbigny, 1905
 Onthophagus inclusus D'Orbigny, 1905
 Onthophagus incollaris Kabakov, 2008
 Onthophagus incornutus MacLeay, 1871
 Onthophagus indigus Péringuey, 1901
 Onthophagus indosinicus Boucomont, 1921
 Onthophagus indutus D'Orbigny, 1902
 Onthophagus inediapterus Kohlmann & Solis, 2001
 Onthophagus inelegans Balthasar, 1935
 Onthophagus ineptus Harold, 1871
 Onthophagus inermiceps D'Orbigny, 1905
 Onthophagus inermicollis D'Orbigny, 1908
 Onthophagus inermivertex Boucomont, 1921
 Onthophagus infaustus Cambefort, 1984
 Onthophagus inflaticollis Bates, 1889
 Onthophagus inflatus Walter & Cambefort, 1977
 Onthophagus infucatus Harold, 1877
 Onthophagus infuscatus Klug, 1845
 Onthophagus insignicollis Frey, 1954
 Onthophagus insignis Péringuey, 1896
 Onthophagus insularis Boheman, 1858
 Onthophagus insulindicus Boucomont, 1914
 Onthophagus insulsus Péringuey, 1901
 Onthophagus intermixtus D'Orbigny, 1902
 Onthophagus interruptus Raffray, 1877
 Onthophagus interstitialis Fahraeus, 1857
 Onthophagus intonsus D'Orbigny, 1913
 Onthophagus intricatus Moretto, 2010
 Onthophagus investigator Lansberge, 1885
 Onthophagus investis D'Orbigny, 1904
 Onthophagus iodiellus Bates, 1887
 Onthophagus ioramaculatus Krikken & Huijbregts, 2012
 Onthophagus ioranus Krikken & Huijbregts, 2012
 Onthophagus irianus Balthasar, 1969
 Onthophagus iris Sharp, 1875
 Onthophagus isanus Masumoto, Ochi & Hanboonsong, 2008
 Onthophagus ishiii Ochi & Kon, 1995
 Onthophagus isikdagensis Pittino, 2004
 Onthophagus itonoborui Masumoto, Ochi & Sakchoowong, 2012
 Onthophagus iulicola Cambefort, 1984
 Onthophagus iumienus Masumoto, Ochi & Hanboonsong, 2007
 Onthophagus iyengari Arrow, 1931

J

 Onthophagus jacksoni D'Orbigny, 1913
 Onthophagus jacobeus Boucomont, 1924
 Onthophagus jalamari Matthews, 1972
 Onthophagus jalapensis Balthasar, 1939
 Onthophagus jangga Matthews, 1972
 Onthophagus janssensi Frey, 1958
 Onthophagus janthinus Harold, 1875
 Onthophagus janushevi Kabakov, 1983
 Onthophagus japonicus Harold, 1875
 Onthophagus javaecola Balthasar, 1959
 Onthophagus javanensis Balthasar, 1963
 Onthophagus javanoides Huijbregts & Krikken, 2011
 Onthophagus jeanneli D'Orbigny, 1913
 Onthophagus jeannelianus Paulian, 1945
 Onthophagus jingping Masumoto, Ochi & Hanboonsong, 2007
 Onthophagus jiupengensis Masumoto, Lan & Kiuchi, 2017
 Onthophagus joannae Goljan, 1953
 Onthophagus johkii Ochi & Kon, 1994
 Onthophagus joliveti Paulian, 1972
 Onthophagus jubatus Harold, 1869
 Onthophagus jugicola D'Orbigny, 1902
 Onthophagus juncticornis D'Orbigny, 1908
 Onthophagus justei Walter, 1989
 Onthophagus juvencus Klug, 1835
 Onthophagus jwalae Karimbumkara & Priyadarsanan, 2016

K

 Onthophagus kabakovi Martin-Piera, 1985
 Onthophagus kachinicus Kabakov, 2006
 Onthophagus kaengkrachangus Masumoto, Ochi & Hanboonsong, 2008
 Onthophagus kakadu Storey & Weir, 1990
 Onthophagus kanarensis Arrow, 1931
 Onthophagus kangeanus Paulian, 1936
 Onthophagus kanyaayonus Masumoto, 1992
 Onthophagus kaosoidowensis Masumoto, Ochi & Hanboonsong, 2008
 Onthophagus kapitensis Frey, 1971
 Onthophagus kapuri Endrödi, 1974
 Onthophagus karenensis Masumoto, Ochi & Hanboonsong, 2008
 Onthophagus kashizakii Kon & Ochi, 2005
 Onthophagus kashmirensis Balthasar, 1966
 Onthophagus kassaicus D'Orbigny, 1908
 Onthophagus katangensis Frey, 1961
 Onthophagus katayamai Masumoto, Ochi & Sakchoowong, 2012
 Onthophagus kavirondus D'Orbigny, 1915
 Onthophagus kawaharai Ochi & Kon, 2007
 Onthophagus kchatriya Boucomont, 1914
 Onthophagus keikoae Ochi & Kon, 2014
 Onthophagus keiseri Frey, 1956
 Onthophagus kentingensis Nomura, 1973
 Onthophagus keralensis Frey, 1975
 Onthophagus keralicus Biswas & Chatterjee, 1986
 Onthophagus khonkaenus Masumoto, Ochi & Hanboonsong, 2008
 Onthophagus khonmiinitnoi Masumoto, 1990
 Onthophagus kiambram Storey, 1977
 Onthophagus kimioi Ochi, Kon & Kawahara, 2011
 Onthophagus kindermanni Harold, 1877
 Onthophagus kindianus Frey, 1953
 Onthophagus kingstoni Cambefort, 1980
 Onthophagus kinhthaicus Kabakov, 1998
 Onthophagus kirki Frey, 1975
 Onthophagus kirokanus Frey, 1975
 Onthophagus kiuchii Masumoto, 1995
 Onthophagus kiyoshii Ochi & Kon, 2007
 Onthophagus kleinei Balthasar, 1935
 Onthophagus knapperti Krikken, 1981
 Onthophagus knausi Brown, 1927
 Onthophagus knulli Howden and Cartwright, 1963
 Onthophagus kochi Frey, 1957
 Onthophagus koebelei Blackburn, 1903
 Onthophagus koechlei Masumoto, Ochi & Kon, 2011
 Onthophagus kokereka Matthews, 1972
 Onthophagus kokocellosus Krikken & Huijbregts, 2013
 Onthophagus kokodanus Krikken & Huijbregts, 2012
 Onthophagus kokodentatus Krikken & Huijbregts, 2013
 Onthophagus kokoiorus Krikken & Huijbregts, 2012
 Onthophagus kokopygus Krikken & Huijbregts, 2013
 Onthophagus kokosquamatus Krikken & Huijbregts, 2012
 Onthophagus kolaka Huijbregts & Krikken, 2009
 Onthophagus kolenatii Reitter, 1892
 Onthophagus koma Matsumura, 1937
 Onthophagus komareki Balthasar, 1935
 Onthophagus kondaoensis Kabakov, 1994
 Onthophagus kongkaewensis Masumoto, Ochi & Sakchoowong, 2012
 Onthophagus koni Ochi, 2007
 Onthophagus konoi Matsumura, 1938
 Onthophagus konsarnensis Masumoto, Ochi & Hanboonsong, 2008
 Onthophagus kontumicus Kabakov, 1983
 Onthophagus kora Storey, 1977
 Onthophagus koryoensis Kim, 1985
 Onthophagus koshunensis Balthasar, 1941
 Onthophagus kouassii Cambefort, 1984
 Onthophagus kozlovi Kabakov, 1990
 Onthophagus kraatzeanus Lansberge, 1883
 Onthophagus krakadaakhomus Masumoto, 1992
 Onthophagus kukali Krikken & Huijbregts, 2013
 Onthophagus kukunorensis Kabakov, 1990
 Onthophagus kulti Balthasar, 1952
 Onthophagus kuluensis Bates, 1891
 Onthophagus kulzeri Frey, 1958
 Onthophagus kumaonensis Arrow, 1931
 Onthophagus kumbaingeri Matthews, 1972
 Onthophagus kuraruanus Matsumura, 1938
 Onthophagus kyleensis Frey, 1975
 Onthophagus kyokoae Masumoto & Ochi, 2015

L

 Onthophagus labdacus Balthasar, 1969
 Onthophagus laborans Arrow, 1931
 Onthophagus lacustris Harold, 1877
 Onthophagus laetus D'Orbigny, 1913
 Onthophagus laevatus D'Orbigny, 1902
 Onthophagus laeviceps D'Orbigny, 1902
 Onthophagus laevidorsis D'Orbigny, 1907
 Onthophagus laevigatus (Fabricius, 1798)
 Onthophagus laevis Harold, 1880
 Onthophagus laevissimus D'Orbigny, 1905
 Onthophagus lagnyi Paulian, 1937
 Onthophagus lahorensis Kabakov, 2008
 Onthophagus lamellicornis Frey, 1953
 Onthophagus lamelliger Gerstaecker, 1871
 Onthophagus lamgalio Matthews, 1972
 Onthophagus laminatus MacLeay, 1864
 Onthophagus laminicornis Lansberge, 1886
 Onthophagus laminidorsis D'Orbigny, 1902
 Onthophagus laminosus D'Orbigny, 1905
 Onthophagus lamnifer D'Orbigny, 1902
 Onthophagus lamotellus Cambefort, 1980
 Onthophagus lamottei Frey, 1962
 Onthophagus lamtoensis Cambefort, 1984
 Onthophagus lamtoi Cambefort, 1980
 Onthophagus lamyi Paulian, 1945
 Onthophagus landolti Harold, 1880
 Onthophagus langkawiensis Ochi & Kon, 2015
 Onthophagus lannamiibun Masumoto, Ochi & Hanboonsong, 2002
 Onthophagus lapillus Arrow, 1931
 Onthophagus laratinus Arrow, 1916
 Onthophagus lassulus Balthasar, 1964
 Onthophagus latenasutus Arrow, 1941
 Onthophagus latepunctatus D'Orbigny, 1913
 Onthophagus latestriatus D'Orbigny, 1908
 Onthophagus latevittatus D'Orbigny, 1905
 Onthophagus laticornis Gebler, 1823
 Onthophagus latigena D'Orbigny, 1897
 Onthophagus latigibber D Orbigny, 1902
 Onthophagus latipennis D'Orbigny, 1897
 Onthophagus latissimus D'Orbigny, 1902
 Onthophagus latro Harold, 1877
 Onthophagus leai Blackburn, 1895
 Onthophagus leanus Goidanich, 1926
 Onthophagus lebasi Boucomont, 1932
 Onthophagus lecontei Harold, 1871
 Onthophagus lefebvrei D'Orbigny, 1913
 Onthophagus lefiniensis Balthasar, 1967
 Onthophagus legendrei Walter & Cambefort, 1977
 Onthophagus leichhardti Monteith & Storey, 2013
 Onthophagus lekmaengtibanphrao Masumoto & Ochi, 2015
 Onthophagus leknamnaous Masumoto & Ochi, 2015
 Onthophagus lemagneni D'Orbigny, 1902
 Onthophagus lemekensis D'Orbigny, 1915
 Onthophagus lemniscatus Gillet, 1924
 Onthophagus lemur (Fabricius, 1781)
 Onthophagus lemuroides D'Orbigny, 1898
 Onthophagus lenis Kabakov, 1998
 Onthophagus lenzii Harold, 1875
 Onthophagus leomontanus Boucomont, 1914
 Onthophagus leroyi D'Orbigny, 1902
 Onthophagus leucopygus Harold, 1867
 Onthophagus leucostigma (Steven, 1811)
 Onthophagus leusermontis Huijbregts & Krikken, 2011
 Onthophagus liberianus Lansberge, 1883
 Onthophagus lilliputanus Lansberge, 1883
 Onthophagus limbatus (Herbst, 1789)
 Onthophagus limonensis Kohlmann & Solis, 2001
 Onthophagus lindaae Masumoto, 1989
 Onthophagus lindu Huijbregts & Krikken, 2009
 Onthophagus liodermus D'Orbigny, 1913
 Onthophagus lioides D'Orbigny, 1902
 Onthophagus liopterus Harold, 1880
 Onthophagus liothorax Koshantschikov, 1894
 Onthophagus lituratus Roth, 1851
 Onthophagus liui Masumoto, Ochi & Lee, 2014
 Onthophagus liwagensis Ochi & Kon, 2006
 Onthophagus lobi Cambefort, 1984
 Onthophagus lojanus Balthasar, 1939
 Onthophagus lomii Muller, 1942
 Onthophagus longegranus Frey, 1957
 Onthophagus longiceps D'Orbigny, 1904
 Onthophagus longimanus Bates, 1887
 Onthophagus longipes Paulian, 1937
 Onthophagus longipilis D'Orbigny, 1905
 Onthophagus lore Huijbregts & Krikken, 2009
 Onthophagus lorianus Gillet, 1930
 Onthophagus loroi Balthasar, 1941
 Onthophagus loudetiae Cambefort, 1984
 Onthophagus loveni Gillet, 1928
 Onthophagus loxodontae Cambefort, 1984
 Onthophagus loxodontaphilus Moretto, 2009
 Onthophagus lucidus (Illiger, 1800)
 Onthophagus luctuosus Boucomont, 1914
 Onthophagus ludicrus Balthasar, 1969
 Onthophagus ludio Boucomont, 1914
 Onthophagus lugens Fahraeus, 1857
 Onthophagus lugubris Fahraeus, 1857
 Onthophagus luismargaritorum Delgado, 1995
 Onthophagus lumareti Walter & Cambefort, 1977
 Onthophagus lunatus Harold, 1868
 Onthophagus lunulifer Boucomont, 1914
 Onthophagus luridipennis Boheman, 1858
 Onthophagus lutaticollis D'Orbigny, 1907
 Onthophagus luteosignatus Lansberge, 1883
 Onthophagus luteus Oustalet, 1874
 Onthophagus lutosopictus Fairmaire, 1897

M

 Onthophagus macedonicus Miksic, 1959
 Onthophagus macleayi Blackburn, 1903
 Onthophagus macrocephalus Kirby, 1818
 Onthophagus macroliberianus Moretto, 2010
 Onthophagus macrothorax D'Orbigny, 1902
 Onthophagus maculosipennis Gillet, 1930
 Onthophagus maculosus D'Orbigny, 1908
 Onthophagus madoqua Arrow, 1931
 Onthophagus maephaluangus Masumoto, Ochi & Hanboonsong, 2007
 Onthophagus maesaensis Masumoto, Ochi & Hanboonsong, 2002
 Onthophagus maesalongensis Masumoto, Ochi & Hanboonsong, 2013
 Onthophagus magnini Paulian, 1933
 Onthophagus magnioculus Ochi & Kon, 2006
 Onthophagus magnipygus Boucomont, 1914
 Onthophagus maki (Illiger, 1803)
 Onthophagus makokou Walter, 1989
 Onthophagus malabarensis Boucomont, 1919
 Onthophagus malangensis Boucomont, 1914
 Onthophagus malasiacus Gillet, 1927
 Onthophagus maleengnaafon Masumoto, 1990
 Onthophagus maleengnoi Masumoto, 1990
 Onthophagus malevolus Balthasar, 1964
 Onthophagus malthinus Gillet, 1930
 Onthophagus mamillatus Lea, 1923
 Onthophagus manguliensis Boucomont, 1914
 Onthophagus manipurensis Arrow, 1907
 Onthophagus maniti Masumoto, 1989
 Onthophagus mankonoensis Balthasar, 1966
 Onthophagus manya Matthews, 1972
 Onthophagus marahouensis Cambefort, 1984
 Onthophagus margaretensis Blackburn, 1903
 Onthophagus margaritifer D'Orbigny, 1898
 Onthophagus marginalis (Gebler, 1817)
 Onthophagus marginatus Castelnau, 1840
 Onthophagus marginicollis Harold, 1880
 Onthophagus marginifer Frey, 1953
 Onthophagus mariozuninoi Delgado, Navarrete & Blackaller-Bages, 1993
 Onthophagus marmotae Kabakov, 1990
 Onthophagus marshalli D'Orbigny, 1908
 Onthophagus martellii Frey, 1972
 Onthophagus martialis Boucomont, 1914
 Onthophagus martinpierai Moctezuma, Rossini & Zunino, 2016
 Onthophagus maruchanus Masumoto, Ochi & Sakchoowong, 2012
 Onthophagus maruyamai Ochi, Kon & Masumoto, 2014
 Onthophagus maryatiae Ochi & Kon, 2005
 Onthophagus masaicus D'Orbigny, 1905
 Onthophagus masaoi Ochi, 1992
 Onthophagus massai Baraud, 1975
 Onthophagus masumotoi Ochi, 1985
 Onthophagus matae Cambefort, 1984
 Onthophagus matanyo Huijbregts & Krikken, 2009
 Onthophagus matsudai Ochi & Kon, 2004
 Onthophagus matsuii Ochi & Kon, 2006
 Onthophagus mauritii Boucomont, 1919
 Onthophagus maxwellianus Moretto, 2013
 Onthophagus maya Zunino, 1981
 Onthophagus mayeri Harold, 1876
 Onthophagus mcclevei Howden and Génier, 2004
 Onthophagus mediofuscatus D'Orbigny, 1908
 Onthophagus medius (Kugelann, 1792)
 Onthophagus medorensis Brown, 1929
 Onthophagus medvedevi Kabakov, 1982
 Onthophagus megapacificus Ochi & Kon, 2006
 Onthophagus megathorax Gillet, 1921
 Onthophagus mekara Huijbregts & Krikken, 2009
 Onthophagus melanocephalus Klug, 1845
 Onthophagus melitaeus (Fabricius, 1798)
 Onthophagus mendeli Ochi, Kon & Barclay, 2009
 Onthophagus mendicus Gillet, 1924
 Onthophagus menieri Ochi, 2003
 Onthophagus menkaoensis Walter & Cambefort, 1977
 Onthophagus mentaveiensis Boucomont, 1914
 Onthophagus merdarius Chevrolat, 1865
 Onthophagus merdrignaci Walter & Cambefort, 1977
 Onthophagus meruanus D'Orbigny, 1908
 Onthophagus merus Péringuey, 1901
 Onthophagus metalliceps Arrow, 1931
 Onthophagus metalliger D'Orbigny, 1913
 Onthophagus mexicanus Bates, 1887
 Onthophagus mextexus Howden and Cartwright, 1970
 Onthophagus micropterus Zunino & Halffter, 1981
 Onthophagus micros D'Orbigny, 1902
 Onthophagus mije Storey & Weir, 1990
 Onthophagus miles D'Orbigny, 1905
 Onthophagus militaris Boucomont, 1914
 Onthophagus millamilla Matthews, 1972
 Onthophagus millingeni D'Orbigny, 1898
 Onthophagus mimikanus Balthasar, 1969
 Onthophagus mimus D'Orbigny, 1913
 Onthophagus minans D'Orbigny, 1913
 Onthophagus minax D'Orbigny, 1904
 Onthophagus mindanaensis Boucomont, 1914
 Onthophagus mindanaoensis Frey, 1971
 Onthophagus minotaurus Arrow, 1941
 Onthophagus minutissimus D'Orbigny, 1908
 Onthophagus minutulus Harold, 1875
 Onthophagus minutus (Hausmann, 1807)
 Onthophagus mirabilis Bates, 1887
 Onthophagus mirandus Arrow, 1931
 Onthophagus miricollis Frey, 1962
 Onthophagus miricornis D'Orbigny, 1902
 Onthophagus mirifrons D'Orbigny, 1905
 Onthophagus miscellaneus D'Orbigny, 1908
 Onthophagus miscellus D'Orbigny, 1905
 Onthophagus misellus D'Orbigny, 1907
 Onthophagus mixticeps D'Orbigny, 1905
 Onthophagus mixtidorsis D'Orbigny, 1905
 Onthophagus mjobergi Gillet, 1925
 Onthophagus mniszechi Harold, 1869
 Onthophagus moajat Huijbregts & Krikken, 2009
 Onthophagus mocquerysi D'Orbigny, 1902
 Onthophagus modestus Harold, 1862
 Onthophagus mogo Krikken & Huijbregts, 2008
 Onthophagus mokwamensis Krikken & Huijbregts, 2012
 Onthophagus monardi Boucomont, 1936
 Onthophagus monardiellus Frey, 1963
 Onthophagus monforti Josso & Prévost, 2006
 Onthophagus mongana Storey & Weir, 1990
 Onthophagus mongkhoni Masumoto, Hanboonsong & Ochi, 2002
 Onthophagus monodon Fahraeus, 1857
 Onthophagus monteithi Matthews, 1972
 Onthophagus montishannoniae Krikken & Huijbrechts, 2008
 Onthophagus montivagus D'Orbigny, 1902
 Onthophagus montreuili Moretto & Génier, 2010
 Onthophagus mopsus (Fabricius, 1792)
 Onthophagus mordindangus Masumoto, Ochi & Hanboonsong, 2008
 Onthophagus moreleti Baraud, 1980
 Onthophagus morenoi Moretto, 2013
 Onthophagus moroni Zunino & Halffter, 1988
 Onthophagus morosus Gerstaecker, 1871
 Onthophagus mpassa Walter, 1982
 Onthophagus mucronatus Thomson, 1858
 Onthophagus mucronifer D'Orbigny, 1905
 Onthophagus muelleri Novak, 1921
 Onthophagus mulgravei Paulian, 1937
 Onthophagus mulleri Lansberge, 1883
 Onthophagus multipunctatus Boucomont, 1914
 Onthophagus mulutagal Ochi, Kon & Barclay, 2016
 Onthophagus mundill Matthews, 1972
 Onthophagus murchisoni Blackburn, 1892
 Onthophagus murgon Monteith & Storey, 2013
 Onthophagus musculus Frey, 1963
 Onthophagus mutatus Harold, 1859
 Onthophagus muticus MacLeay, 1864

N

 Onthophagus naaroon Masumoto, 1990
 Onthophagus nabeleki Balthasar, 1939
 Onthophagus naevius D'Orbigny, 1913
 Onthophagus naevuliger D'Orbigny, 1908
 Onthophagus nagasawai Matsumura, 1938
 Onthophagus nagpurensis Arrow, 1931
 Onthophagus nammuldi Matthews, 1972
 Onthophagus namnaoensis Masumoto, Ochi & Hanboonsong, 2002
 Onthophagus namnaous Masumoto, Ochi & Hanboonsong, 2013
 Onthophagus nampatensis Tarasov & Kabakov, 2010
 Onthophagus nanus Harold, 1878
 Onthophagus napolovi Kabakov, 1998
 Onthophagus nasalis Arrow, 1931
 Onthophagus nasicornis Harold, 1869
 Onthophagus nasicus Gillet, 1930
 Onthophagus naso Fahraeus, 1857
 Onthophagus nasonis Kabakov, 1998
 Onthophagus nasutus Guérin-Méneville, 1855
 Onthophagus natronis Cambefort, 1984
 Onthophagus navarretorum Delgado & Capistan, 1996
 Onthophagus neboissi Frey, 1970
 Onthophagus nebulosus Reiche, 1864
 Onthophagus necessarius Reitter, 1892
 Onthophagus necrophagus Arrow, 1931
 Onthophagus neervoorti Boucomont, 1914
 Onthophagus nefarius Balthasar, 1963
 Onthophagus negligens Walker, 1858
 Onthophagus nemorivagus Kohlmann & Solis, 2001
 Onthophagus neocolobus Scheuern, 1996
 Onthophagus neofurcatus Goidanich, 1926
 Onthophagus neomirabilis Howden, 1973
 Onthophagus neostenocerus Goidanich, 1926
 Onthophagus neyo Moretto, 2013
 Onthophagus nicobaricus Biswas, Chatterjee & Sengupta, 1999
 Onthophagus nigellus (Illiger, 1803)
 Onthophagus nigerianus D'Orbigny, 1913
 Onthophagus nigriceps Raffray, 1877
 Onthophagus nigrinus Paulian, 1937
 Onthophagus nigriobscurior Ochi, Kon & Tsubaki, 2009
 Onthophagus nigripennis D'Orbigny, 1908
 Onthophagus nigriventris d'Orbigny, 1905
 Onthophagus nigrivestis D'Orbigny, 1902
 Onthophagus nigropubens D'Orbigny, 1908
 Onthophagus nikolajevi Kabakov, 2006
 Onthophagus nilgirensis Gillet, 1922
 Onthophagus nilicola D'Orbigny, 1902
 Onthophagus niloticus Harold, 1879
 Onthophagus nimbatus D'Orbigny, 1905
 Onthophagus niokolokoba Moretto, 2007
 Onthophagus nitefactus Harold, 1877
 Onthophagus nitidifrons D'Orbigny, 1905
 Onthophagus nitidior Bates, 1887
 Onthophagus nitidulus Klug, 1845
 Onthophagus nodieri D'Orbigny, 1908
 Onthophagus nodulifer Harold, 1867
 Onthophagus nongkaiensis Masumoto, Ochi & Hanboonsong, 2002
 Onthophagus nonstriatus D'Orbigny, 1905
 Onthophagus notatus D'Orbigny, 1902
 Onthophagus notiodes Solis & Kohlmann, 2003
 Onthophagus novaeirlandiae Balthasar, 1969
 Onthophagus nubilus Kohlmann & Solis, 2001
 Onthophagus nuchicornis (Linnaeus, 1758)
 Onthophagus nudatus D'Orbigny, 1913
 Onthophagus nudifrons Balthasar, 1939
 Onthophagus nudus D'Orbigny, 1908
 Onthophagus numidicus D'Orbigny, 1908
 Onthophagus nurestanicus Kabakov, 1982
 Onthophagus nurubuan Matthews, 1972
 Onthophagus nyctopus Bates, 1887
 Onthophagus nymani Gillet, 1930

O

 Onthophagus obenbergeri Balthasar, 1965
 Onthophagus oberthuri D'Orbigny, 1898
 Onthophagus obliquus (Olivier, 1789)
 Onthophagus obliviosus Balthasar, 1935
 Onthophagus oblongus Zhang, 1997
 Onthophagus obscurior Boucomont, 1914
 Onthophagus obtusicornis Fahraeus, 1857
 Onthophagus obtutus Péringuey, 1901
 Onthophagus occipitalis Lansberge, 1885
 Onthophagus ocellatopunctatus Waterhouse, 1875
 Onthophagus ocellidorsis D'Orbigny, 1915
 Onthophagus ocellifer D'Orbigny, 1902
 Onthophagus ocelliger Harold, 1877
 Onthophagus ochii Masumoto, 1988
 Onthophagus ochreatus D'Orbigny, 1897
 Onthophagus ochromerus Harold, 1877
 Onthophagus ochropygus D'Orbigny, 1902
 Onthophagus octogonus Frey, 1962
 Onthophagus octonaevus Kabakov, 1994
 Onthophagus oculatus Arrow, 1931
 Onthophagus ofianus Krikken & Huijbregts, 2013
 Onthophagus ohbayashii Nomura, 1939
 Onthophagus ohkuboi Ochi & Kon, 2006
 Onthophagus okahandjanus Balthasar, 1974
 Onthophagus oklahomensis Brown, 1927
 Onthophagus olidus Balthasar, 1964
 Onthophagus olsoufieffi Boucomont, 1924
 Onthophagus omostigma D'Orbigny, 1902
 Onthophagus onorei Zunino & Halffter, 1997
 Onthophagus onthochromus Arrow, 1913
 Onthophagus ontosatu Huijbregts & Krikken, 2012
 Onthophagus opacicollis Reitter, 1892
 Onthophagus opacifalculatus Ochi, Kon & Tsubaki, 2009
 Onthophagus opacihartiniae Ochi & Kon, 2015
 Onthophagus opacotaurus Krikken & Huijbregts, 2012
 Onthophagus ophion Erichson, 1847
 Onthophagus ophtalmicus Frey, 1958
 Onthophagus orbicularis Lansberge, 1885
 Onthophagus orbus Boucomont, 1924
 Onthophagus orientalis Harold, 1868
 Onthophagus orissanus Arrow, 1931
 Onthophagus ornaticollis Gillet, 1930
 Onthophagus ornatulus D'Orbigny, 1908
 Onthophagus orpheus (Panzer, 1794)
 Onthophagus orphnoides Bates, 1887
 Onthophagus orthocerus Thomson, 1858
 Onthophagus osculatii Guérin-Méneville, 1855
 Onthophagus osellai Pittino, 1982
 Onthophagus oshimanus Nakane, 1960
 Onthophagus otai Ochi & Kon, 2006
 Onthophagus otjivarongus Balthasar, 1967
 Onthophagus ouratita Matthews, 1972
 Onthophagus ovatulus Heer, 1847
 Onthophagus ovatus (Linnaeus, 1767)
 Onthophagus ovigranosus Frey, 1971
 Onthophagus ovulum Gerstaecker, 1871

P

 Onthophagus pacificus Lansberge, 1885
 Onthophagus padrinoi Delgado, 1999
 Onthophagus palamoui Biswas & Chatterjee, 1986
 Onthophagus palatus Boucomont, 1914
 Onthophagus palavanus Balthasar, 1959
 Onthophagus palawanicus Ochi & Kon, 2004
 Onthophagus palawantagal Ochi, Kon & Barclay, 2016
 Onthophagus paliceps Arrow, 1931
 Onthophagus pallidipennis Fahraeus, 1857
 Onthophagus pallidus D'Orbigny, 1905
 Onthophagus paluma Matthews, 1972
 Onthophagus panici Petrovitz, 1964
 Onthophagus papuater Krikken & Huijbregts, 2012
 Onthophagus papuensis Harold, 1877
 Onthophagus papulatorius Kabakov, 2008
 Onthophagus papulatus Boucomont, 1914
 Onthophagus papuplicatus Krikken & Huijbregts, 2012
 Onthophagus papurugosus Krikken & Huijbregts, 2012
 Onthophagus paracentricornis Ochi & Kon, 2014
 Onthophagus parachandrai Ochi, Kon & Tsubaki, 2009
 Onthophagus parafalculatus Ochi, Kon & Tsubaki, 2009
 Onthophagus parafasciatus Balthasar, 1974
 Onthophagus parallelicornis Macleay, 1887
 Onthophagus paramasaoi Ochi, Kon & Barclay, 2009
 Onthophagus parapalatus Krikken & Huijbregts, 1988
 Onthophagus parapedisequus Balthasar, 1969
 Onthophagus paravinctus Tagliaferri & Moretto, 2012
 Onthophagus parceguttatus D'Orbigny, 1902
 Onthophagus parcenotatus D'Orbigny, 1913
 Onthophagus parcepictus D'Orbigny, 1908
 Onthophagus parcepilosus Balthasar, 1966
 Onthophagus pardalis (Fabricius, 1798)
 Onthophagus parenthesis Boucomont, 1913
 Onthophagus parisii Balthasar, 1941
 Onthophagus parmatus Reitter, 1892
 Onthophagus paroculus Krikken & Huijbregts, 1987
 Onthophagus parrumbal Matthews, 1972
 Onthophagus parryi Harold, 1869
 Onthophagus parumnotatus Fahraeus, 1857
 Onthophagus parviobscurior Ochi, Kon & Tsubaki, 2009
 Onthophagus parvulus (Fabricius, 1798)
 Onthophagus parvus Blanchard, 1853
 Onthophagus pasotagal Ochi, Kon & Barclay, 2016
 Onthophagus pastillatus Boucomont, 1919
 Onthophagus paucigranosus Lansberge, 1886
 Onthophagus paulianellus Frey, 1958
 Onthophagus pauliani Balthasar, 1937
 Onthophagus pauper Boucomont, 1914
 Onthophagus pauxillus D'Orbigny, 1902
 Onthophagus pavidus Harold, 1877
 Onthophagus pedator Sharp, 1875
 Onthophagus pedester Howden & Génier, 2004
 Onthophagus pedisequus Balthasar, 1969
 Onthophagus pendjarius Josso & Prévost, 2006
 Onthophagus penedwardsae Monteith & Storey, 2013
 Onthophagus peninsularis Boucomont, 1914
 Onthophagus peninsulomerus Huijbregts & Krikken, 2011
 Onthophagus penmani Masumoto & Ochi & Hanboonsong, 2002
 Onthophagus pennsylvanicus Harold, 1871
 Onthophagus pentacanthus Harold, 1867
 Onthophagus peotoxus Krikken & Huijbregts, 2012
 Onthophagus perakensis Ochi, Kon & Masumoto, 2014
 Onthophagus peramelinus (Lea, 1923)
 Onthophagus perniger Boucomont, 1930
 Onthophagus perpilosus MacLeay, 1871
 Onthophagus personatus Boucomont, 1914
 Onthophagus petenensis Howden & Gill, 1993
 Onthophagus petrovitzi Frey, 1975
 Onthophagus petrovitzianus Pittino, 2006
 Onthophagus pexatus Harold, 1869
 Onthophagus peyrierasi Paulian, 1985
 Onthophagus phahompokus Masumoto & Ochi, 2015
 Onthophagus phakuaiensis Masumoto, Ochi & Hanboonsong, 2013
 Onthophagus phanaeicollis Lansberge, 1883
 Onthophagus phanaeides Frey, 1956
 Onthophagus phanaeiformis Boucomont, 1914
 Onthophagus phanaeomorphus Janssens, 1954
 Onthophagus phatoensis Masumoto, Ochi & Hanboonsong, 2008
 Onthophagus phetchabunensis Masumoto, Ochi & Hanboonsong, 2002
 Onthophagus philippinensis Boucomont, 1919
 Onthophagus phillippsorum Krikken & Huijbregts, 1987
 Onthophagus phoenicocerus Lea, 1923
 Onthophagus phrixus Balthasar, 1969
 Onthophagus phrutsaphaakhomus Masumoto, 1992
 Onthophagus phukhieoensis Masumoto, Ochi & Hanboonsong, 2007
 Onthophagus phuquoci Paulian, 1945
 Onthophagus picatus D'Orbigny, 1902
 Onthophagus piceiceps D'Orbigny, 1904
 Onthophagus piceorufulus Kabakov, 1994
 Onthophagus picipennis Hope, 1841
 Onthophagus pictipennis D'Orbigny, 1913
 Onthophagus pictipodex D'Orbigny, 1902
 Onthophagus picturatus D'Orbigny, 1908
 Onthophagus pictus Reitter, 1892
 Onthophagus piffli Petrovitz, 1961
 Onthophagus pilicollis D'Orbigny, 1902
 Onthophagus pilipodex D'Orbigny, 1913
 Onthophagus pillara Matthews, 1972
 Onthophagus pilosus Fahraeus, 1857
 Onthophagus pimpasaleei Masumoto, Ochi & Hanboonsong, 2008
 Onthophagus pinaroo Storey & Weir, 1990
 Onthophagus pinguis Gerstaecker, 1871
 Onthophagus pipitzi Ancey, 1883
 Onthophagus pisciphagus Walter & Cambefort, 1977
 Onthophagus pithankithae Karimbumkara & Priyadarsanan, 2016
 Onthophagus placens Péringuey, 1904
 Onthophagus planaticeps D'Orbigny, 1913
 Onthophagus planiceps MacLeay, 1886
 Onthophagus planicollis Harold, 1880
 Onthophagus planifrons Frey, 1962
 Onthophagus platalea Arrow, 1941
 Onthophagus platypus Zhang, 1997
 Onthophagus plebejus Klug, 1855
 Onthophagus pleurogonus D'Orbigny, 1913
 Onthophagus plicatifrons D'Orbigny, 1908
 Onthophagus pljushtchi Ivanova, 2012
 Onthophagus poeophagus Kabakov, 1979
 Onthophagus poggii Scheuern, 1996
 Onthophagus politissimus D'Orbigny, 1908
 Onthophagus politus (Fabricius, 1798)
 Onthophagus pollicatus Harold, 1879
 Onthophagus polyedrus D'Orbigny, 1905
 Onthophagus polyodon D'Orbigny, 1913
 Onthophagus polyphemi Hubbard, 1894  (gopher tortoise onthophagus beetle)
 Onthophagus polystigma D'Orbigny, 1902
 Onthophagus ponticus Harold, 1883
 Onthophagus pooensis Cambefort & Nicolas, 1991
 Onthophagus popovi Kabakov, 1983
 Onthophagus porcus Arrow, 1931
 Onthophagus possoi Walter, 1982
 Onthophagus posticicornis D'Orbigny, 1913
 Onthophagus posticus Erichson, 1842
 Onthophagus potanini Kabakov, 1979
 Onthophagus praecellens Bates, 1887
 Onthophagus praedatus Harold, 1862
 Onthophagus praelaminatus Frey, 1957
 Onthophagus praestans Péringuey, 1901
 Onthophagus praetortus Péringuey, 1904
 Onthophagus prehensilis (Arrow, 1920)
 Onthophagus privus Kabakov, 1998
 Onthophagus probus Péringuey, 1901
 Onthophagus procurvus Balthasar, 1935
 Onthophagus prodromus Heer, 1862
 Onthophagus producticollis D'Orbigny, 1908
 Onthophagus productus Arrow, 1907
 Onthophagus profanus Frey, 1958
 Onthophagus proletarius Harold, 1875
 Onthophagus promontorii Boucomont, 1924
 Onthophagus pronus Erichson, 1842
 Onthophagus propinquus Macleay, 1888
 Onthophagus propraecellens Howden & Gill, 1987
 Onthophagus proteus D'Orbigny, 1902
 Onthophagus protuberans Frey, 1955
 Onthophagus proximus D'Orbigny, 1908
 Onthophagus pseudoaeneus D'Orbigny, 1908
 Onthophagus pseudobidens D'Orbigny, 1915
 Onthophagus pseudobrutus Kabakov, 1983
 Onthophagus pseudocaccobius Reitter, 1889
 Onthophagus pseudoconvexicollis Bai & Yang, 2016
 Onthophagus pseudocoracinus Kabakov, 1983
 Onthophagus pseudocostifer Krikken & Huijbregts, 2012
 Onthophagus pseudofimetarius Balthasar, 1946
 Onthophagus pseudofuscus Zunino and Halffter, 1988
 Onthophagus pseudohystrix Masumoto, 1995
 Onthophagus pseudojaponicus Balthasar, 1941
 Onthophagus pseudojavanus Paulian, 1931
 Onthophagus pseudoliberianus Moretto, 2010
 Onthophagus pseudopilosus Frey, 1958
 Onthophagus pseudoplebejus Moretto, 2009
 Onthophagus pseudosanguineus Walter & Cambefort, 1977
 Onthophagus pseudosellatus Balthasar, 1964
 Onthophagus pseudoundulans Zunino & Halffter, 1988
 Onthophagus pseudovinctus Tagliaferri & Moretto, 2012
 Onthophagus pseudoworoae Ochi, Kon & Barclay, 2009
 Onthophagus psychopompus Ziani & Garakhloo, 2010
 Onthophagus ptox Erichson, 1847
 Onthophagus puberulus D'Orbigny, 1902
 Onthophagus pugionatus Fahraeus, 1857
 Onthophagus pugnacior Blackburn, 1903
 Onthophagus pugnax Harold, 1868
 Onthophagus pulchellus D'Orbigny, 1905
 Onthophagus pullatus D'Orbigny, 1905
 Onthophagus pullus Roth, 1851
 Onthophagus pumilus Kabakov, 2014
 Onthophagus punctator Reitter, 1892
 Onthophagus punctatus (Illiger, 1803)
 Onthophagus punneeae Masumoto, 1989
 Onthophagus punthari Storey, 1977
 Onthophagus pupillatus Kolbe, 1886
 Onthophagus purifrons D'Orbigny, 1908
 Onthophagus purpurascens Boucomont, 1914
 Onthophagus purpureicollis MacLeay, 1864
 Onthophagus pusillus (Fabricius, 1798)
 Onthophagus pusio Fahraeus, 1857
 Onthophagus pygargus Motschulsky, 1845
 Onthophagus pygidialis Lansberge, 1883
 Onthophagus pygmaeus (Schaller, 1783)

Q-R

 Onthophagus quadricallosus D'Orbigny, 1902
 Onthophagus quadricolor Kabakov, 1983
 Onthophagus quadricuspis D'Orbigny, 1908
 Onthophagus quadridentatus (Fabricius, 1798)
 Onthophagus quadrilunatus D'Orbigny, 1902
 Onthophagus quadrimaculatus Raffray, 1877
 Onthophagus quadrinodosus Fahraeus, 1857
 Onthophagus quadrinodus Reitter, 1896
 Onthophagus quadrinotatus D'Orbigny, 1905
 Onthophagus quadripustulatus (Fabricius, 1775)
 Onthophagus quasijohkii Ochi & Kon, 2005
 Onthophagus quasitagal Ochi & Kon, 2005
 Onthophagus queenslandicus Blackburn, 1903
 Onthophagus quetzalis Howden & Gill, 1993
 Onthophagus quinquetuberculatus MacLeay, 1871
 Onthophagus quiproquo Moretto & Génier, 2010
 Onthophagus rachelis Martin-Piera, 1985
 Onthophagus ragazzii D'Orbigny, 1904
 Onthophagus rakovici Pittino, 2004
 Onthophagus ramosellus Bates, 1891
 Onthophagus ramosus (Wiedemann, 1823)
 Onthophagus rana Arrow, 1931
 Onthophagus ranongensis Masumoto, Ochi & Hanboonsong, 2008
 Onthophagus ranongjohkii Ochi, Kon & Barclay, 2016
 Onthophagus ranunculus Arrow, 1913
 Onthophagus rasipennis D'Orbigny, 1908
 Onthophagus ratchasimaensis Masumoto, Hanboonsong & Ochi, 2002
 Onthophagus ratchataniensis Masumoto, Ochi & Hanboonsong, 2013
 Onthophagus rectecornutus Lansberge, 1883
 Onthophagus rectestriatus D'Orbigny, 1915
 Onthophagus rectilamina D'Orbigny, 1902
 Onthophagus rectorispauliani Cambefort, 1980
 Onthophagus refulgens Arrow, 1931
 Onthophagus regalis Arrow, 1907
 Onthophagus remotus Harold, 1879
 Onthophagus reticollis MacLeay, 1886
 Onthophagus reticulatus D'Orbigny, 1902
 Onthophagus reticuliger Frey, 1960
 Onthophagus reyesi Zunino & Halffter, 1988
 Onthophagus rhinocerus Gomes Alves, 1944
 Onthophagus rhinolophus Harold, 1869
 Onthophagus rhinophyllus Harold, 1868
 Onthophagus rhodesianus Frey, 1975
 Onthophagus rhynchophorus Péringuey, 1904
 Onthophagus ribbei Boucomont, 1914
 Onthophagus riparius Lansberge, 1885
 Onthophagus robertopoggii Ochi & Kon, 2006
 Onthophagus rodentium Pittino, 2004
 Onthophagus roessneri Ziani, 2016
 Onthophagus rorarius Harold, 1877
 Onthophagus rosenbergi Krikken & Huijbregts, 2011
 Onthophagus rosettae Frey, 1958
 Onthophagus rostratus Harold, 1869
 Onthophagus rotundatus D'Orbigny, 1905
 Onthophagus rotundibasis D'Orbigny, 1902
 Onthophagus rotundicollis Lansberge, 1883
 Onthophagus roubali Balthasar, 1935
 Onthophagus rougonorum Cambefort, 1984
 Onthophagus rouyeri Boucomont, 1914
 Onthophagus royi Biswas & Chatterjee, 1985
 Onthophagus ruandanus Frey, 1971
 Onthophagus rubefactus D'Orbigny, 1913
 Onthophagus rubellus D'Orbigny, 1908
 Onthophagus rubens D'Orbigny, 1902
 Onthophagus rubenticollis D'Orbigny, 1902
 Onthophagus rubescens Macleay, 1888
 Onthophagus rubicundulus MacLeay, 1871
 Onthophagus rubidus D'Orbigny, 1913
 Onthophagus rubrescens Blanchard, 1843
 Onthophagus rubricatus D'Orbigny, 1902
 Onthophagus rubricollis Hope, 1831
 Onthophagus rubrimaculatus MacLeay, 1864
 Onthophagus rubripennis Arrow, 1907
 Onthophagus rufescens Bates, 1887
 Onthophagus ruficapillus Brullé, 1832
 Onthophagus ruficauda Arrow, 1931
 Onthophagus rufimanus Kabakov, 1982
 Onthophagus rufiobscurior Ochi, Kon & Tsubaki, 2009
 Onthophagus rufipodex D'Orbigny, 1913
 Onthophagus rufobasalis Fairmaire, 1887
 Onthophagus rufocastaneus Fairmaire, 1887
 Onthophagus rufolimbatus D'Orbigny, 1913
 Onthophagus rufonotatus D'Orbigny, 1902
 Onthophagus rufopygus Frey, 1957
 Onthophagus rufosignatus MacLeay, 1864
 Onthophagus rufostillans D'Orbigny, 1907
 Onthophagus rufovirens D'Orbigny, 1904
 Onthophagus rugicollis Harold, 1880
 Onthophagus rugidorsis D'Orbigny, 1913
 Onthophagus rugosicollis Gillet, 1925
 Onthophagus rugosipennis Frey, 1973
 Onthophagus rugosissimus D'Orbigny, 1913
 Onthophagus rugulipennis Fairmaire, 1887
 Onthophagus rugulosus Harold, 1886
 Onthophagus rupicapra Waterhouse, 1894
 Onthophagus rutilans Sharp, 1875
 Onthophagus rutriceps Krikken & Huijbregts, 2012

S

 Onthophagus sabahensis Ochi & Kon, 2006
 Onthophagus sabai Masumoto, Ochi & Sakchoowong, 2012
 Onthophagus sacharovskii Olsoufieff, 1918
 Onthophagus saggitarius (Fabricius, 1775)
 Onthophagus sagittarius (Fabricius, 1775)
 Onthophagus sahai Biswas & Chatterjee, 1986
 Onthophagus saïgonensis Boucomont, 1924
 Onthophagus sakaeratensis Masumoto, Hanboonsong & Ochi, 2002
 Onthophagus sakainoi Masumoto, 1991
 Onthophagus salebrosus Macleay, 1888
 Onthophagus saleyeri Lansberge, 1883
 Onthophagus salvadorensis Zunino & Halffter, 1988
 Onthophagus salvazai Paulian, 1978
 Onthophagus samai Ziani, 2011
 Onthophagus samoengus Masumoto, Ochi & Hanboonsong, 2008
 Onthophagus sanggona Huijbregts & Krikken, 2009
 Onthophagus sangirensis Boucomont, 1914
 Onthophagus sanguineus D'Orbigny, 1902
 Onthophagus sanguinolentus D'Orbigny, 1908
 Onthophagus sangwalus Masumoto, Ochi & Hanboonsong, 2008
 Onthophagus sansibaricus Harold, 1878
 Onthophagus sarasinorum Krikken & Huijbregts, 2011
 Onthophagus sasajii Ochi & Kon, 2001
 Onthophagus saudiensis Frey, 1962
 Onthophagus sauteri Gillet, 1924
 Onthophagus savanicola Cambefort, 1984
 Onthophagus scaber Roth, 1851
 Onthophagus scaberrimus D'Orbigny, 1904
 Onthophagus scabriusculus Harold, 1873
 Onthophagus scapularis D'Orbigny, 1902
 Onthophagus sceptrifer Boucomont, 1924
 Onthophagus schaefernai Balthasar, 1935
 Onthophagus schaefferi Howden & Cartwright, 1963
 Onthophagus schaufussi Harold, 1867
 Onthophagus schawalleri Scheuern, 1996
 Onthophagus schillhammeri Kabakov, 2006
 Onthophagus schoolmeestersi Ochi & Kon, 2007
 Onthophagus schunckei Paulian, 1936
 Onthophagus sciron Balthasar, 1969
 Onthophagus scotti Masumoto, Ochi & Hanboonsong, 2002
 Onthophagus scrutator Harold, 1877
 Onthophagus sculptilis Gerstaecker, 1871
 Onthophagus seabrai (Gomes Alves, 1944)
 Onthophagus secundarius Roth, 1851
 Onthophagus sellatulus D'Orbigny, 1902
 Onthophagus sellatus Klug, 1845
 Onthophagus sembeli Krikken & Huijbregts, 2008
 Onthophagus semiaratus D'Orbigny, 1902
 Onthophagus semiasper D'Orbigny, 1902
 Onthophagus semicinctus D'Orbigny, 1897
 Onthophagus semicornis (Panzer, 1798)
 Onthophagus semicroceus D'Orbigny, 1915
 Onthophagus semidanumensis Ochi, Kon & Barclay, 2009
 Onthophagus semiflavus Boheman, 1860
 Onthophagus semigraniger D'Orbigny, 1905
 Onthophagus semigranosus Lansberge, 1883
 Onthophagus semilaevis D'Orbigny, 1913
 Onthophagus semimetallicus Lea, 1923
 Onthophagus seminitens D'Orbigny, 1902
 Onthophagus seminitidus D'Orbigny, 1908
 Onthophagus semiopacus Harold, 1869
 Onthophagus semipacificus Ochi & Kon, 2006
 Onthophagus semiperakensis Ochi, Kon & Masumoto, 2014
 Onthophagus semipersonatus Ochi, Kon & Tsubaki, 2009
 Onthophagus semipiceus Kabakov, 1998
 Onthophagus semivestitus Paulian, 1937
 Onthophagus semivirescens D'Orbigny, 1902
 Onthophagus semiviridis D'Orbigny, 1904
 Onthophagus semiworoae Ochi, Kon & Masumoto, 2014
 Onthophagus senegalensis D'Orbigny, 1902
 Onthophagus senescens Péringuey, 1908
 Onthophagus senex Boucomont, 1914
 Onthophagus seniculus (Fabricius, 1781)
 Onthophagus sepilokensis Ochi & Kon, 2006
 Onthophagus seramicus Huijbregts & Krikken, 2012
 Onthophagus serdangensis Lansberge, 1886
 Onthophagus sericans Frey, 1975
 Onthophagus sericatus Reitter, 1892
 Onthophagus sericeicollis Boucomont, 1928
 Onthophagus serienotatus D'Orbigny, 1902
 Onthophagus seseba Krikken & Huijbregts, 2017
 Onthophagus setchan Masumoto, 1984
 Onthophagus setoculus Krikken & Huijbregts, 1987
 Onthophagus setosus Fahraeus, 1857
 Onthophagus sexdentatus Boucomont, 1919
 Onthophagus sexstriatus Montrouzier, 1855
 Onthophagus shapovalovi Gusakov, 2012
 Onthophagus sharpi Harold, 1875
 Onthophagus shillongensis Scheuern, 1995
 Onthophagus shimba Cambefort, 1980
 Onthophagus shirakii Nakane, 1960
 Onthophagus sibela Huijbregts & Krikken, 2012
 Onthophagus sibiricus Harold, 1877
 Onthophagus sibuyanus Boucomont, 1924
 Onthophagus sidama Gestro, 1895
 Onthophagus sideki Krikken & Huijbregts, 1987
 Onthophagus signaticollis Frey, 1970
 Onthophagus signifer Harold, 1877
 Onthophagus sihkahonoi Huijbregts & Krikken, 2009
 Onthophagus sikkimensis Gillet, 1925
 Onthophagus silus Balthasar, 1960
 Onthophagus simboroni Ochi & Kon, 2006
 Onthophagus similis (Scriba, 1790)
 Onthophagus simillimus D'Orbigny, 1913
 Onthophagus simius Reitter, 1892
 Onthophagus simoni D'Orbigny, 1902
 Onthophagus simplex Raffray, 1877
 Onthophagus simpliciceps D'Orbigny, 1905
 Onthophagus simplicifrons Reitter, 1892
 Onthophagus simulator D'Orbigny, 1905
 Onthophagus sinagai Krikken & Huijbregts, 2008
 Onthophagus singhaakhomus Masumoto, 1992
 Onthophagus singulariformis Kohlmann & Solis, 2001
 Onthophagus sinuosicollis D'Orbigny, 1905
 Onthophagus sinuosus D'Orbigny, 1913
 Onthophagus sipilouensis Cambefort, 1984
 Onthophagus sisyphoides Krikken, 1977
 Onthophagus sjoestethi D'Orbigny, 1904
 Onthophagus sloanei Blackburn, 1903
 Onthophagus smeenki Cambefort, 1980
 Onthophagus smetanai Balthasar, 1952
 Onthophagus snoflaki Balthasar, 1944
 Onthophagus sobrius Balthasar, 1959
 Onthophagus socialis Arrow, 1931
 Onthophagus solidus Gillet, 1927
 Onthophagus solisi Howden & Gill, 1993
 Onthophagus solivagus Harold, 1886
 Onthophagus solmani Stebnicka, 1975
 Onthophagus solomonensis Krikken & Huijbregts, 2012
 Onthophagus somalicola Balthasar, 1941
 Onthophagus songsokensis Biswas & Chatterjee, 1985
 Onthophagus sophiae Nicolas, 2006
 Onthophagus sopu Krikken & Huijbregts, 2017
 Onthophagus sparsepunctatus Frey, 1956
 Onthophagus sparsulus Reitter, 1892
 Onthophagus spathatus Boucomont, 1914
 Onthophagus speculifer Solsky, 1876
 Onthophagus spiculatus Boucomont, 1914
 Onthophagus spinicornis Gillet, 1930
 Onthophagus spinifex (Fabricius, 1781)
 Onthophagus spitsbergeniensis Krell, 2010
 Onthophagus splendidoides Josso, 2013
 Onthophagus splendidus Boucomont, 1932
 Onthophagus sprecherae Moretto, 2013
 Onthophagus spurcatus D'Orbigny, 1905
 Onthophagus squalidus Lea, 1923
 Onthophagus stanleyi Moretto & Génier, 2010
 Onthophagus statzi Krell, 1990
 Onthophagus stehliki Balthasar, 1966
 Onthophagus steinheili Harold, 1880
 Onthophagus stellio Erichson, 1843
 Onthophagus stenocerus Harold, 1867
 Onthophagus sternalis Arrow, 1931
 Onthophagus sternax Balthasar, 1959
 Onthophagus sticticus Harold, 1867
 Onthophagus stictus D'Orbigny, 1913
 Onthophagus stigmosus D'Orbigny, 1902
 Onthophagus stillatus D'Orbigny, 1904
 Onthophagus stockwelli Howden & Young, 1981
 Onthophagus stomachosus Krell, 2009
 Onthophagus strabo Reitter, 1892
 Onthophagus strandi Balthasar, 1935
 Onthophagus streltsovi Tarasov & Kabakov, 2010
 Onthophagus striatulus (Palisot de Beauvois, 1809)
 Onthophagus strictestriatus D'Orbigny, 1913
 Onthophagus strnadi Kabakov, 1998
 Onthophagus stuhlmanni D'Orbigny, 1908
 Onthophagus stylocerus Graëlls, 1851
 Onthophagus subaeneus (Palisot de Beauvois, 1811)
 Onthophagus subalternans D'Orbigny, 1902
 Onthophagus subansiriensis Biswas, 1979
 Onthophagus subcancer Howden, 1973
 Onthophagus subcinctus D'Orbigny, 1913
 Onthophagus subcornutus Boucomont, 1914
 Onthophagus subdivisus D'Orbigny, 1908
 Onthophagus subhumeralis D'Orbigny, 1902
 Onthophagus subnudus D'Orbigny, 1902
 Onthophagus subocellatus D'Orbigny, 1905
 Onthophagus subocelliger Blackburn, 1903
 Onthophagus subopacus Robinson, 1940
 Onthophagus subplanus D'Orbigny, 1902
 Onthophagus subrugosus D'Orbigny, 1905
 Onthophagus subsapaensis Kabakov, 1994
 Onthophagus subsulcatus D'Orbigny, 1908
 Onthophagus subtropicus Howden & Cartwright, 1963
 Onthophagus subulifer D'Orbigny, 1908
 Onthophagus suermelii Petrovitz, 1963
 Onthophagus suffusus Klug, 1855
 Onthophagus sugihartoi Ochi, 2007
 Onthophagus sugillatus Klug, 1855
 Onthophagus suginoi Ochi, 1984
 Onthophagus suginokoichii Ochi & Kon, 2008
 Onthophagus suillus Arrow, 1931
 Onthophagus sulawesiensis Krikken & Huijbregts, 2011
 Onthophagus sulawesijohkii Ochi, Kon & Barclay, 2016
 Onthophagus sulcatulus D'Orbigny, 1907
 Onthophagus sulci Balthasar, 1935
 Onthophagus sulcipennis D'Orbigny, 1902
 Onthophagus sumatramontanus Ochi & Kon, 2008
 Onthophagus sumatranus Lansberge, 1883
 Onthophagus sumbavensis Boucomont, 1914
 Onthophagus sumptuosus Paulian, 1937
 Onthophagus sunantaae Masumoto, 1989
 Onthophagus sundanensis Lansberge, 1883
 Onthophagus surdus Boucomont, 1925
 Onthophagus susterai Balthasar, 1952
 Onthophagus sutiliceps D'Orbigny, 1902
 Onthophagus sutleinensis Splichal, 1910
 Onthophagus suturalis Péringuey, 1888
 Onthophagus suturellus Brullé, 1832
 Onthophagus sycophanta Fairmaire, 1887
 Onthophagus sydneyensis Blackburn, 1903
 Onthophagus sylvestris Walter & Cambefort, 1977
 Onthophagus sylvipapuanus Krikken & Huijbregts, 2012
 Onthophagus symbioticus (Arrow, 1920)
 Onthophagus synceri Cambefort, 1984

T

 Onthophagus taayai Masumoto, 1995
 Onthophagus tabellicornis MacLeay, 1864
 Onthophagus tabellifer Gillet, 1927
 Onthophagus tabidus Balthasar, 1935
 Onthophagus taboranus D'Orbigny, 1902
 Onthophagus taeniatus Boucomont, 1914
 Onthophagus tagal Boucomont, 1924
 Onthophagus taiensis Cambefort, 1984
 Onthophagus taiwanus Nomura, 1973
 Onthophagus taiyaruensis Masumoto, 1977
 Onthophagus takaoi Ochi & Kon, 2014
 Onthophagus talpa Fahraeus, 1857
 Onthophagus tambing Krikken & Huijbregts, 2011
 Onthophagus tamworthi Blackburn, 1903
 Onthophagus tanganus D'Orbigny, 1913
 Onthophagus taoi Ochi & Kon, 2006
 Onthophagus tapirus Sharp, 1877
 Onthophagus taprobanus Arrow, 1931
 Onthophagus tarandus (Fabricius, 1792)
 Onthophagus tarascus Zunino & Halffter, 1988
 Onthophagus tarasovi Krikken & Huijbregts, 2012
 Onthophagus tarsius Arrow, 1941
 Onthophagus tatsienluensis Balthasar, 1942
 Onthophagus taurinus White, 1844
 Onthophagus tauroides Gillet, 1930
 Onthophagus taurus (Schreber, 1759)  (bull headed dung beetle)
 Onthophagus taxillus Balthasar, 1969
 Onthophagus teitanicus D'Orbigny, 1902
 Onthophagus telegonus Balthasar, 1969
 Onthophagus telephus Balthasar, 1969
 Onthophagus temporalis D'Orbigny, 1902
 Onthophagus tenax Balthasar, 1964
 Onthophagus tenebrosus Harold, 1871
 Onthophagus tenuigraniger D'Orbigny, 1913
 Onthophagus tenuistriatus D'Orbigny, 1905
 Onthophagus terminatus (Eschscholtz, 1822)
 Onthophagus terrara Storey, 1977
 Onthophagus tersicollis Müller, 1947
 Onthophagus tersipennis D'Orbigny, 1902
 Onthophagus tersus D'Orbigny, 1913
 Onthophagus tesquorum Semenov & Medvedev, 1927
 Onthophagus tesseratus D'Orbigny, 1908
 Onthophagus tessulatus Harold, 1871
 Onthophagus testaceoviolaceus Paulian, 1937
 Onthophagus tetricus Harold, 1877
 Onthophagus thai Kabakov, 1994
 Onthophagus thailaevis Masumoto, Ochi & Hanboonsong, 2008
 Onthophagus thainuaensis Masumoto, Ochi & Hanboonsong, 2008
 Onthophagus thanwaakhomus Masumoto, 1992
 Onthophagus tharalithae Karimbumkara & Priyadarsanan, 2016
 Onthophagus tholaayi Masumoto, 1990
 Onthophagus thoreyi Harold, 1868
 Onthophagus tiamicus Kabakov, 1994
 Onthophagus tibetanus Arrow, 1907
 Onthophagus tigrinus D'Orbigny, 1908
 Onthophagus timorensis Boucomont, 1914
 Onthophagus tiniocelloides Boucomont, 1925
 Onthophagus tirapensis Biswas & Chatterjee, 1985
 Onthophagus tnai Nithya & Sabu, 2012
 Onthophagus togeman Matthews, 1972
 Onthophagus tongbantumi Masumoto, Ochi & Hanboonsong, 2002
 Onthophagus tonkineus Gillet, 1921
 Onthophagus tonsus D'Orbigny, 1902
 Onthophagus tonywhitteni Krikken & Huijbregts, 2011
 Onthophagus toopi Monteith & Storey, 2013
 Onthophagus toraut Krikken & Huijbregts, 2011
 Onthophagus totonicapamus Bates, 1887
 Onthophagus toxopeus Krikken & Huijbregts, 2012
 Onthophagus traginus Frey, 1972
 Onthophagus tragoides Boucomont, 1914
 Onthophagus tragus (Fabricius, 1792)
 Onthophagus transcaspicus Koenig, 1889
 Onthophagus transisthmius Howden & Young, 1981
 Onthophagus transquadridentatus Scheuern, 1995
 Onthophagus transvestitus Huijbregts & Krikken, 2009
 Onthophagus trapezicornis D'Orbigny, 1902
 Onthophagus traversii D'Orbigny, 1904
 Onthophagus trawalla Storey & Weir, 1990
 Onthophagus triacanthus Castelnau, 1840
 Onthophagus tricariniger D'Orbigny, 1902
 Onthophagus tricavicollis Lea, 1923
 Onthophagus triceratops Arrow, 1913
 Onthophagus trichopygus D'Orbigny, 1905
 Onthophagus tricolor Boucomont, 1914
 Onthophagus tricorniger Boheman, 1860
 Onthophagus tridenticeps D'Orbigny, 1902
 Onthophagus tridentitibialis Ochi & Kon, 2008
 Onthophagus trifidisetis D'Orbigny, 1905
 Onthophagus trigibber Reitter, 1892
 Onthophagus triimpressus D'Orbigny, 1905
 Onthophagus trinodosus Fahraeus, 1857
 Onthophagus trinominatus Goidanich, 1926
 Onthophagus tripartitus D'Orbigny, 1902
 Onthophagus tripolitanus Heyden, 1890
 Onthophagus triptolemus Balthasar, 1969
 Onthophagus trispinus Reitter, 1892
 Onthophagus tristis Harold, 1873
 Onthophagus tritinctus Boucomont, 1914
 Onthophagus trituber (Wiedemann, 1823)
 Onthophagus triundulatus Balthasar, 1964
 Onthophagus trochilus Arrow, 1931
 Onthophagus troglodyta (Wiedemann, 1823)
 Onthophagus troniceki Balthasar, 1933
 Onthophagus truchmenus Kolenati, 1846
 Onthophagus truncaticornis (Schaller, 1783)
 Onthophagus tschadensis Balthasar, 1963
 Onthophagus tschoffeni D'Orbigny, 1904
 Onthophagus tshuapae Balthasar, 1964
 Onthophagus tsubakii Ochi & Kon, 2009
 Onthophagus tsutomui Ochi & Kon, 2016
 Onthophagus tuberculifrons Harold, 1871
 Onthophagus tubericollis Raffray, 1877
 Onthophagus tuckonie Matthews, 1972
 Onthophagus tumami Masumoto, Ochi & Hanboonsong, 2002
 Onthophagus tumidulus Gerstaecker, 1871
 Onthophagus tungkamangensis Masumoto, Ochi & Hanboonsong, 2007
 Onthophagus tungkamungensis Masumoto, Ochi & Hanboonsong, 2008
 Onthophagus turbatus Walker, 1858
 Onthophagus turfanicus Balthasar, 1971
 Onthophagus turgidus Kohlmann & Solís, 2012
 Onthophagus turneri Boucomont, 1936
 Onthophagus turpidoides Kabakov, 2008
 Onthophagus turpidus Reitter, 1887
 Onthophagus turrbal Matthews, 1972
 Onthophagus tuzetae Walter & Cambefort, 1977
 Onthophagus tweedensis Blackburn, 1903

U-V

 Onthophagus ubaidillahi Krikken & Huijbregts, 2012
 Onthophagus uedai Ochi & Kon, 2006
 Onthophagus uelensis Frey, 1960
 Onthophagus uenoi Ochi, 1995
 Onthophagus ukerewensis Balthasar, 1937
 Onthophagus ulugombakensis Ochi, Kon & Masumoto, 2014
 Onthophagus ulula Balthasar, 1966
 Onthophagus umbilicatus D'Orbigny, 1908
 Onthophagus umbratus D'Orbigny, 1902
 Onthophagus undaticeps D'Orbigny, 1902
 Onthophagus undulans Bates, 1889
 Onthophagus unguiculatus Kabakov, 1994
 Onthophagus unicarina D'Orbigny, 1904
 Onthophagus unidentatus Boucomont, 1927
 Onthophagus unifasciatus (Schaller, 1783)
 Onthophagus uniformis Heyden, 1886
 Onthophagus urellus Boucomont, 1919
 Onthophagus ursinus D'Orbigny, 1902
 Onthophagus ursus Boucomont, 1926
 Onthophagus urusheeri Krell, 2000
 Onthophagus usambaricus Paulian, 1937
 Onthophagus usurpator Balthasar, 1959
 Onthophagus vacca (Linnaeus, 1767)
 Onthophagus vanasseni Krikken & Huijbregts, 2008
 Onthophagus vanderblomi Krikken & Huijbregts, 2008
 Onthophagus vaneyeni Frey, 1960
 Onthophagus vanofwegeni Krikken & Huijbregts, 2008
 Onthophagus varianus Lea, 1923
 Onthophagus variatus D'Orbigny, 1902
 Onthophagus variegatus (Fabricius, 1798)
 Onthophagus variegranosus D'Orbigny, 1905
 Onthophagus variolaris Lansberge, 1883
 Onthophagus variolicollis Lea, 1923
 Onthophagus variolosus D'Orbigny, 1902
 Onthophagus varius D'Orbigny, 1913
 Onthophagus vassei D'Orbigny, 1908
 Onthophagus vatovai Muller, 1942
 Onthophagus vaulogeri Boucomont, 1923
 Onthophagus velliger D'Orbigny, 1907
 Onthophagus velutinus Horn, 1875
 Onthophagus ventralis Lansberge, 1883
 Onthophagus ventrosus D'Orbigny, 1905
 Onthophagus venzoi Balthasar, 1941
 Onthophagus veracruzensis Delgado & Pensado, 1998
 Onthophagus verae Josso, 2013
 Onthophagus vermiculatus Frey, 1970
 Onthophagus verrucosus D'Orbigny, 1902
 Onthophagus versutus Péringuey, 1901
 Onthophagus verticalis Fahraeus, 1857
 Onthophagus verticicornis (Laicharting, 1781)
 Onthophagus vesanus Balthasar, 1967
 Onthophagus vespertilio Howden & Cartwright & Hallfter, 1956
 Onthophagus vestitus D'Orbigny, 1902
 Onthophagus vethi Krikken, 1977
 Onthophagus vicinus Harold, 1886
 Onthophagus victoriensis Blackburn, 1903
 Onthophagus viduus Harold, 1875
 Onthophagus vigens Péringuey, 1901
 Onthophagus vigilans Boucomont, 1921
 Onthophagus vilis Harold, 1877
 Onthophagus villanuevai Delgado & Deloya, 1990
 Onthophagus villosus Macleay, 1888
 Onthophagus vinctoides Frey, 1957
 Onthophagus vinctus Erichson, 1843
 Onthophagus violaceotinctus Gillet, 1925
 Onthophagus violaceoviridis Paulian, 1937
 Onthophagus violetae Zunino & Halffter, 1997
 Onthophagus virescens Harold, 1867
 Onthophagus viridiaereus D'Orbigny, 1908
 Onthophagus viridicatus D'Orbigny, 1902
 Onthophagus viridicervicapra Ochi, Kon & Tsubaki, 2009
 Onthophagus viridiperakensis Ochi, Kon & Masumoto, 2014
 Onthophagus viridis Ménétriès, 1832
 Onthophagus viriditinctus Reitter, 1892
 Onthophagus viridivinosus Kohlmann & Solis, 2001
 Onthophagus vitulus (Fabricius, 1776)
 Onthophagus viviensis D'Orbigny, 1905
 Onthophagus vladimiri Frey, 1957
 Onthophagus vlasovi Medvedev, 1958
 Onthophagus volucer Balthasar, 1959
 Onthophagus vuattouxi Cambefort, 1984
 Onthophagus vulpes Harold, 1877
 Onthophagus vulpinaris Schönfeldt, 1906
 Onthophagus vulpinus Arrow, 1931
 Onthophagus vultuosus D'Orbigny, 1902
 Onthophagus vultur Arrow, 1931
 Onthophagus vylderi D'Orbigny, 1913

W-Z

 Onthophagus wagamen Matthews, 1972
 Onthophagus wakelbura Matthews, 1972
 Onthophagus wallacei Harold, 1871
 Onthophagus walteri Macleay, 1887
 Onthophagus waminda Matthews, 1972
 Onthophagus wanappe Storey, 1977
 Onthophagus wangi Masumoto, Chen & Ochi, 2004
 Onthophagus wangnamkhieoensis Masumoto, Hanboonsong & Ochi, 2002
 Onthophagus wangnamkieous Masumoto, Ochi & Hanboonsong, 2008
 Onthophagus waterloti D'Orbigny, 1908
 Onthophagus waterstradti Boucomont, 1914
 Onthophagus watuwila Krikken & Huijbregts, 2008
 Onthophagus wayaua Huijbregts & Krikken, 2012
 Onthophagus wensis Josso & Prévost, 2006
 Onthophagus weringerong Storey & Weir, 1990
 Onthophagus wiebesi Krikken, 1977
 Onthophagus wigmungan Matthews, 1972
 Onthophagus wilgi Matthews, 1972
 Onthophagus willameorum Walter & Cambefort, 1977
 Onthophagus williamsi Storey & Weir, 1990
 Onthophagus witteianus Krell, 2009
 Onthophagus wombalano Matthews, 1972
 Onthophagus woroae Ochi & Kon, 2006
 Onthophagus worooa Storey & Weir, 1990
 Onthophagus xanthochlorus Walter & Cambefort, 1977
 Onthophagus xanthomerus Bates, 1887
 Onthophagus xanthopterus D'Orbigny, 1908
 Onthophagus xanthopygus D'Orbigny, 1908
 Onthophagus xiphias Solis & Kohlmann, 2003
 Onthophagus yackatoon Storey & Weir, 1990
 Onthophagus yakuinsulanus Nakane, 1984
 Onthophagus yamaokai Masumoto, Ochi & Hanboonsong, 2002
 Onthophagus yangi Masumoto, Tsai & Ochi, 2006
 Onthophagus yangmunensis Masumoto & Ochi, 2015
 Onthophagus yanoi Matsumura, 1938
 Onthophagus yaoi Masumoto, Ochi & Lee, 2014
 Onthophagus yaran Storey & Weir, 1990
 Onthophagus yarrumba Storey, 1977
 Onthophagus yasuhikoi Masumoto, Ochi & Sakchoowong, 2012
 Onthophagus yeyeko Matthews, 1972
 Onthophagus yifer Krikken & Huijbregts, 2012
 Onthophagus yiryoront Matthews, 1972
 Onthophagus yourula Storey & Weir, 1990
 Onthophagus yubarinus Matsumura, 1937
 Onthophagus yucatanus Delgado-Castillo, Peraza & Deloya, 2006
 Onthophagus yujii Masumoto, Ochi & Sakchoowong, 2012
 Onthophagus yumotoi Ochi & Kon, 2006
 Onthophagus yungaburra Matthews, 1972
 Onthophagus yunkara Matthews, 1972
 Onthophagus zagrosicus Kabakov, 2006
 Onthophagus zairensis Walter & Cambefort, 1977
 Onthophagus zapotecus Zunino & Halffter, 1988
 Onthophagus zavattarii Müller, 1939
 Onthophagus zavreli Balthasar, 1935
 Onthophagus zebra Arrow, 1931
 Onthophagus zebu Boucomont, 1921
 Onthophagus zetteli Masumoto, Ochi & Hanboonsong, 2002
 Onthophagus zicsii Balthasar, 1967
 Onthophagus zimmermanni Balthasar, 1959
 Onthophagus zinovskyi Qaryagdy, 1939
 Onthophagus zumpti Frey, 1954
 Onthophagus zuninoi Martin-Piera, 1985
 Onthophagus zuvandi Qaryagdy, 1939
 Onthophagus zymoticus Moxey, 1963

References

Onthophagus